= James A. Garfield =

President of the United States in 1881

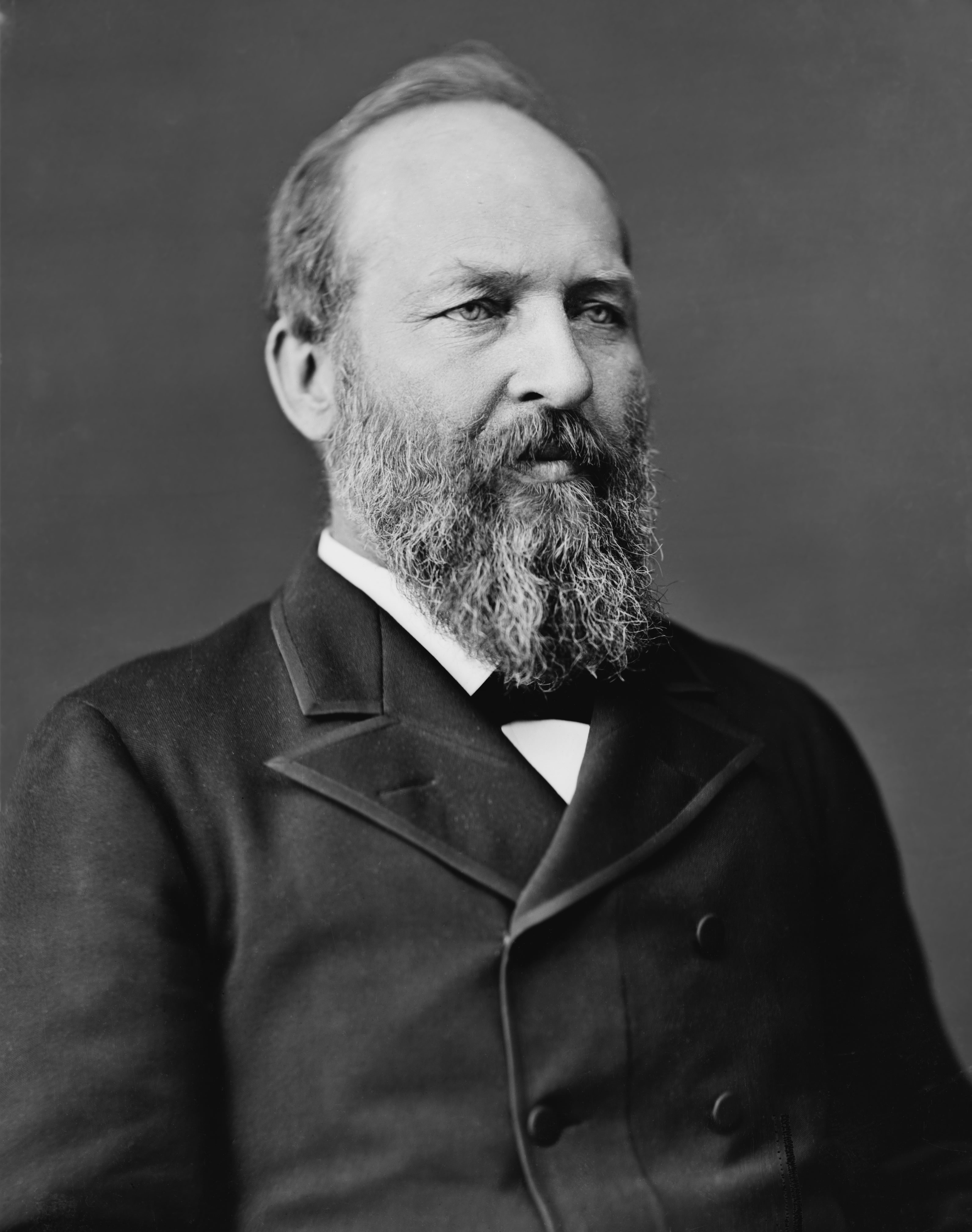
- Garfield c. 1881

20th President of the United States
- In office March 4 – September 19, 1881
- Vice President: Chester A. Arthur
- Preceded by: Rutherford B. Hayes
- Succeeded by: Chester A. Arthur

Member of the U.S. House of Representatives from Ohio's 19th district
- In office March 4, 1863 – November 8, 1880
- Preceded by: Albert G. Riddle
- Succeeded by: Ezra B. Taylor
House positions
Ranking Member of the House Ways and Means Committee
In office March 4, 1879 – November 8, 1880
Preceded by	William D. Kelley
Succeeded by	William D. Kelley
Chair of the House Appropriations Committee
In office March 4, 1871 – March 4, 1875
Preceded by	Henry L. Dawes
Succeeded by	Samuel J. Randall
Chair of the House Banking and Currency Committee
In office March 4, 1869 – March 4, 1871
Preceded by	Theodore Pomeroy
Succeeded by	Samuel Hooper
Chair of the House Military Affairs Committee
In office March 4, 1867 – March 4, 1869
Preceded by	Robert C. Schenck
Succeeded by	John A. Logan

Member of the Ohio Senate from the 26th district
- In office January 2, 1860 – August 21, 1861
- Preceded by: George P. Ashmun
- Succeeded by: Lucius V. Bierce

Personal details
- Born: James Abram Garfield; November 19, 1831 Moreland Hills, Ohio, U.S.
- Died: September 19, 1881 (aged 49) Elberon, New Jersey, U.S.
- Cause of death: Massive infection including sepsis and pneumonia after being shot
- Resting place: James A. Garfield Memorial, Cleveland, Ohio
- Party: Republican
- Spouse: Lucretia Rudolph (m. 1858)
- Children: 7, including Hal,Mollie Garfield James, and Abram
- Education: Western Reserve Eclectic Institute; Williams College (BA)
- Occupation: Politician; lawyer; preacher; educator

Military service
- Allegiance: United States
- Branch/service: Union Army
- Years of service: 1861–1863
- Rank: Major general
- Commands: 42nd Ohio Volunteer Infantry; 20th Brigade, 6th Division, Army of the Ohio
- Battles/wars: American Civil War; Battle of Middle Creek; Battle of Shiloh; Siege of Corinth; Tullahoma Campaign; Battle of Chickamauga

James Abram Garfield (November 19, 1831 – September 19, 1881) was the 20th president of the United States, serving from March 1881 until his death in September that year after being shot in July. A preacher, lawyer, and Civil War general, Garfield served nine terms in the United States House of Representatives and is the only sitting member of the House to be elected president. Before he ran for president, the Ohio General Assembly had elected him to the U.S. Senate, a position he declined upon becoming president-elect.

Garfield was born into poverty in a log cabin and grew up in northeast Ohio. After graduating from Williams College in 1856, he studied law and became an attorney. Garfield was a preacher in the Restoration Movement and president of the Western Reserve Eclectic Institute, affiliated with the Disciples. (Note: Divisions in the Stone-Campbell Movement were not recognized until the 20th Century. The names Christian Church, Church of Christ, and Disciples of Christ were used interchangeably until then.) He was elected as a Republican member of the Ohio State Senate in 1859, serving until 1861. Garfield opposed Confederate secession, was a major general in the Union Army during the American Civil War, and fought in the battles of Middle Creek, Shiloh, and Chickamauga. He was elected to Congress in 1862 to represent Ohio's 19th district. Throughout his congressional service, Garfield firmly supported the gold standard and gained a reputation as a skilled orator. He initially agreed with Radical Republican views on Reconstruction but later favored a Moderate Republican–aligned approach to civil rights enforcement for freedmen. Garfield's aptitude for mathematics extended to his own proof of the Pythagorean theorem, published in 1876, and his advocacy of using statistics to inform government policy.

At the 1880 Republican National Convention, delegates chose Garfield, who had not sought the White House, as a compromise presidential nominee on the 36th ballot. In the 1880 presidential election, he conducted a low-key front porch campaign and narrowly defeated the Democratic nominee, Winfield Scott Hancock. Garfield's accomplishments as president included his assertion of presidential authority against senatorial courtesy in executive appointments, a purge of corruption in the Post Office, and his appointment of a Supreme Court justice. He advocated for agricultural technology, an educated electorate, and civil rights for African Americans. He also proposed substantial civil service reforms, which were passed by Congress in 1883 as the Pendleton Civil Service Reform Act and signed into law by his successor, Chester A. Arthur. Garfield was a member of the intraparty "Half-Breed" faction that used the powers of the presidency to defy the powerful "Stalwart" Senator Roscoe Conkling from New York. He did this by appointing Blaine faction leader William H. Robertson to the lucrative post of Collector of the Port of New York. The ensuing political battle resulted in Robertson's confirmation and the resignations of Conkling and Thomas C. Platt from the Senate.

On July 2, 1881, Garfield was shot by Charles J. Guiteau, a deluded office seeker. He died on September 19 from infections related to the wounds and was succeeded by Vice President Chester A. Arthur. Due to Garfield's brief term in office and lack of major changes during his tenure, historians tend to rank him as a below-average president or omit his name entirely from rankings, though some view Garfield's potential favorably, praising him for his anti-corruption and pro-civil rights stances.

== Childhood and early life ==
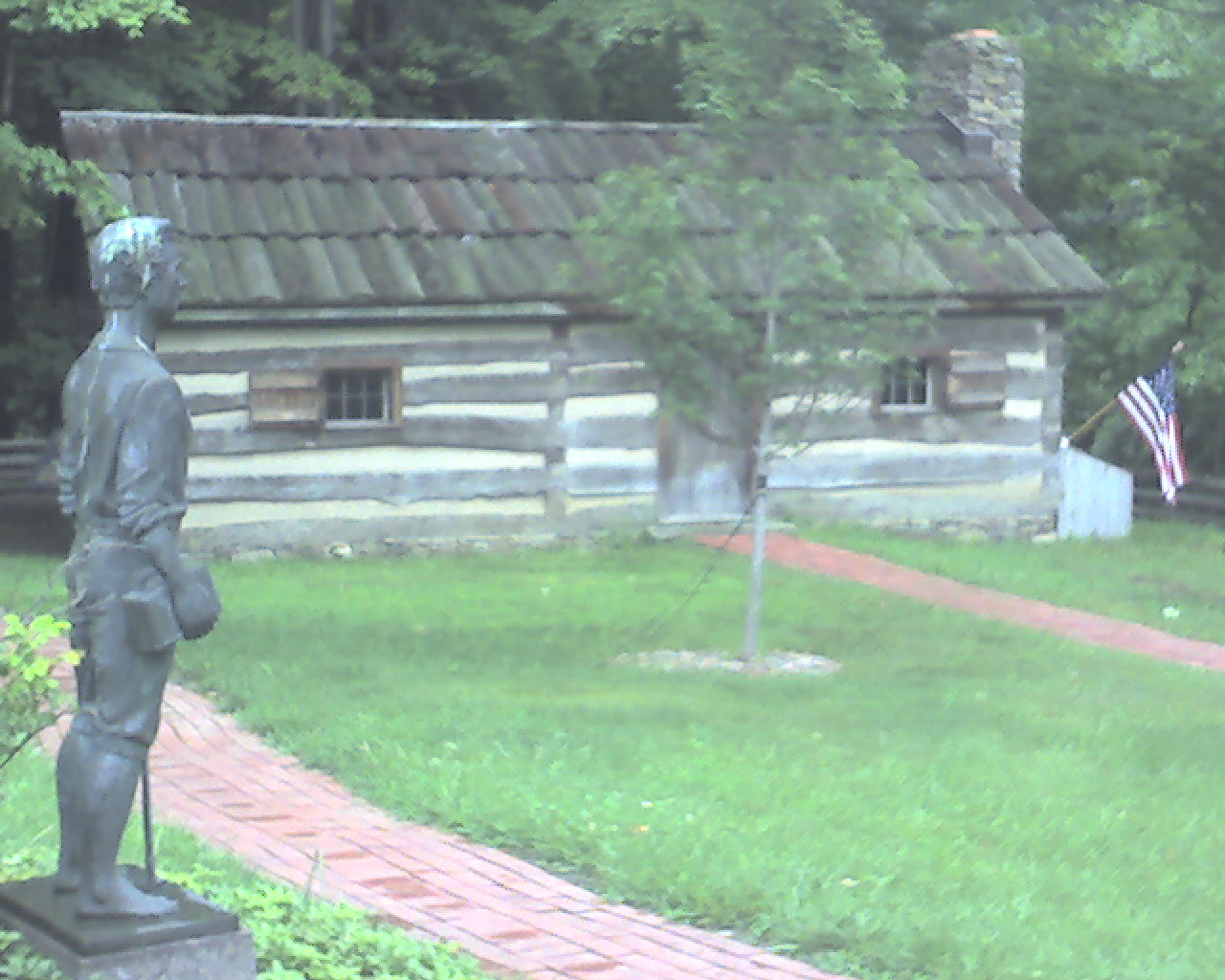
Replica of the log cabin in Moreland Hills, Ohio, where Garfield was born

James Abram Garfield was born the youngest of five children on November 19, 1831, in a log cabin in Orange Township, which later became Moreland Hills, Ohio. (Note: Orange Township had been in the Western Reserve until 1800.) Garfield's ancestor Edward Garfield migrated from Hillmorton, Warwickshire, England, to Massachusetts around 1630. James's father Abraham was born in Worcester, New York, and came to Ohio to woo his childhood sweetheart, Mehitabel Ballou, only to find her married. He instead wed her sister Eliza, who was born in New Hampshire. James was named after an earlier son of Eliza and Abram who had died in infancy.

In early 1833, Abram and Eliza Garfield joined a Stone-Campbell church, a decision that influenced their youngest son's life. Abram died later that year, and James was raised in poverty in a household led by his strong-willed mother. He was her favorite child and the two remained close for the rest of his life. Eliza remarried in 1842, but soon left her second husband, Warren (or Alfred) Belden, and a divorce was awarded in 1850. James took his mother's side in the matter and noted Belden's 1880 death with satisfaction in his diary. Garfield also enjoyed his mother's stories about his ancestry, especially those about his Welsh great-great-grandfathers and an ancestor who served as a knight of Caerphilly Castle.

Poor and fatherless, Garfield was mocked by his peers and became sensitive to slights throughout his life; he sought escape through voracious reading. He left home at age 16 in 1847 and was rejected for work on the only ship in port in Cleveland. Garfield instead found work on a canal boat, managing the mules that pulled it. Horatio Alger later used this labor to good effect when he wrote Garfield's campaign biography in 1880.

After six weeks, illness forced Garfield to return home, and during his recuperation, his mother and a local school official secured his promise to forgo canal work for a year of school. In 1848, he began at Geauga Seminary, in nearby Chester Township, Geauga County, Ohio. Garfield later said of his childhood, "I lament that I was born to poverty, and in this chaos of childhood, seventeen years passed before I caught any inspiration ... a precious 17 years when a boy with a father and some wealth might have become fixed in manly ways."

== Education, marriage and early career ==
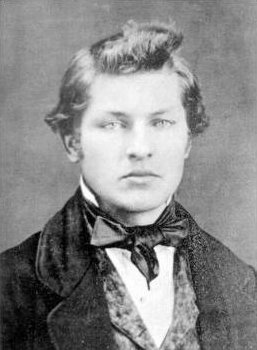
Garfield at the age of 16

Garfield attended Geauga Seminary from 1848 to 1850 and learned academic subjects for which he had not previously had time. He excelled as a student and was especially interested in languages and elocution. He began to appreciate the power a speaker had over an audience, writing that the speaker's platform "creates some excitement. I love agitation and investigation and glory in defending unpopular truth against popular error." Geauga was coeducational, and Garfield was attracted to one of his classmates, Lucretia Rudolph, whom he later married. To support himself at Geauga, he worked as a carpenter's assistant and teacher. The need to go from town to town to find work as a teacher aggravated Garfield, and he developed a dislike of what he called "place-seeking", which became, he said, "the law of my life." In later years, he astounded his friends by disregarding positions that could have been his with little politicking. Garfield had attended church more to please his mother than to worship God, but in his late teens he underwent a religious awakening. He attended many camp meetings, which led to his being born again on March 4, 1850, when he was baptized by being submerged in the icy waters of the Chagrin River.

After he left Geauga, Garfield worked for a year at various jobs, including teaching jobs. Finding that some New Englanders worked their way through college, Garfield determined to do the same and sought a school that could prepare him for the entrance examinations. From 1851 to 1854, he attended the Western Reserve Eclectic Institute (later named Hiram College) in Hiram, Ohio, a school founded by and still affiliated with the Christian Church (Disciples of Christ). While there, he was most interested in the study of Greek and Latin but was inclined to learn about and discuss any new thing he encountered. Securing a position on entry as janitor, he obtained a teaching position while he was still a student there. Lucretia Rudolph also enrolled at the Institute and Garfield wooed her while teaching her Greek. He developed a regular preaching circuit at neighboring churches and, in some cases, earned one gold dollar per service. By 1854, Garfield had learned all the Institute could teach him and was a full-time teacher. Garfield then enrolled at Williams College in Williamstown, Massachusetts, as a third-year student; he received credit for two years' study at the Institute after passing a cursory examination. Garfield was also impressed with the college president, Mark Hopkins, who had responded warmly to Garfield's letter inquiring about admission. He said of Hopkins, "The ideal college is Mark Hopkins on one end of a log with a student on the other." Hopkins later said of Garfield in his student days, "There was a large general capacity applicable to any subject. There was no pretense of genius, or alternation of spasmodic effort, but a satisfactory accomplishment in all directions." After his first term, Garfield was hired to teach penmanship to the students of nearby Pownal, Vermont, a post Chester A. Arthur previously held.

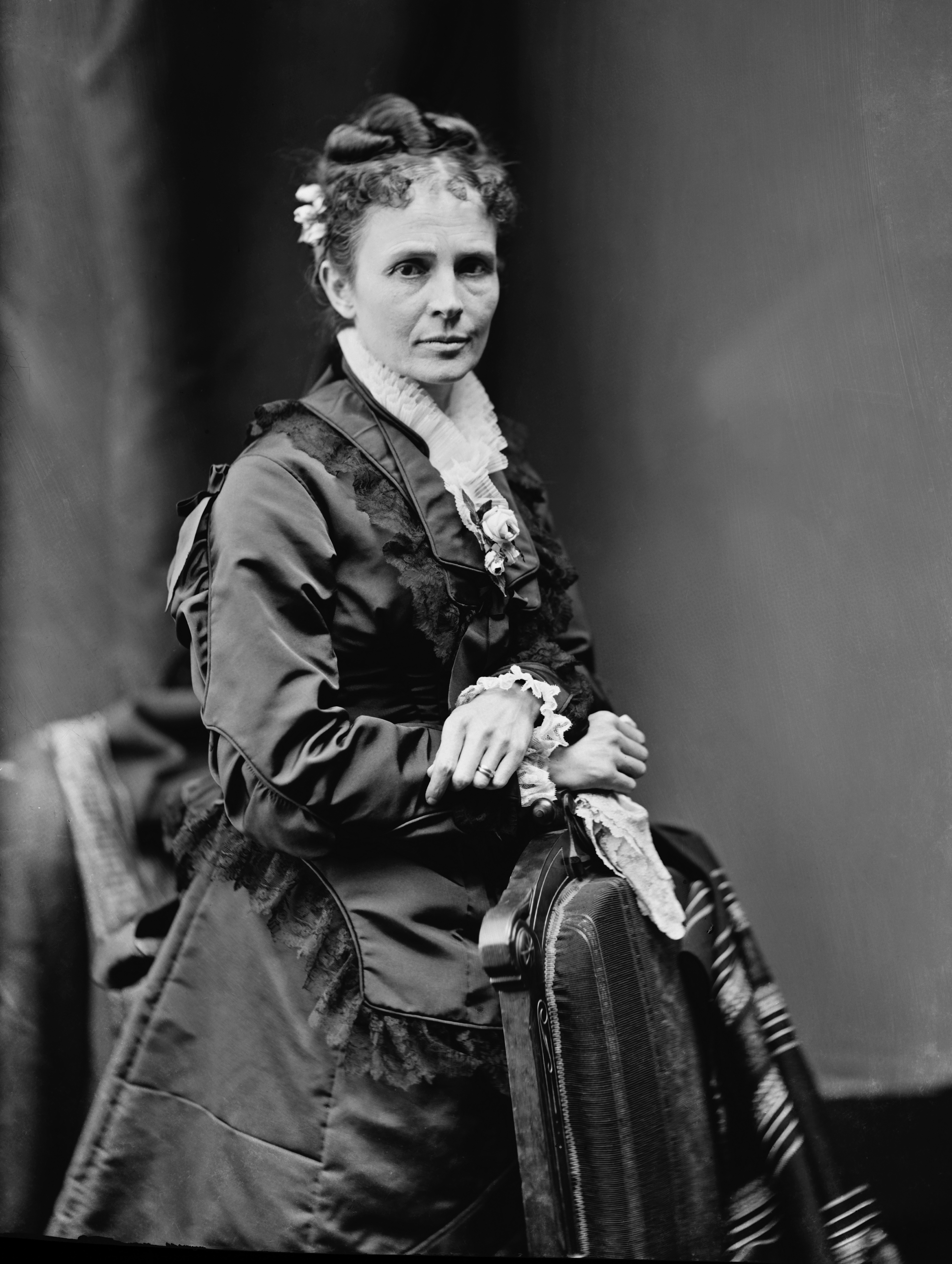
Lucretia Garfield in the 1870s

Garfield graduated Phi Beta Kappa from Williams in August 1856, was named salutatorian, and spoke at the commencement. His biographer Ira Rutkow writes that Garfield's years at Williams gave him the opportunity to know and respect those of different social backgrounds, and that, despite his origin as an unsophisticated Westerner, socially conscious New Englanders liked and respected him. "In short," Rutkow writes, "Garfield had an extensive and positive first experience with the world outside the Western Reserve of Ohio."

Upon his return to Ohio, the degree from a prestigious Eastern college made Garfield a man of distinction. He returned to Hiram to teach at the Institute and in 1857 was made its principal, though he did not see education as a field that would realize his full potential. The abolitionist atmosphere at Williams had enlightened him politically, after which he began to consider politics as a career. He campaigned for Republican presidential candidate John C. Frémont in 1856. In 1858, he married Lucretia, and they had seven children, five of whom survived infancy. Soon after the wedding, he registered to read law at the office of attorney Albert Gallatin Riddle in Cleveland, though he did his studying in Hiram. He was admitted to the bar in 1861.

Local Republican leaders invited Garfield to enter politics upon the death of Cyrus Prentiss, the presumptive nominee for the local state senate seat. He was nominated at the party convention on the sixth ballot and was elected, serving from 1860 to 1861. Garfield's major effort in the state senate was an unsuccessful bill providing for Ohio's first geological survey to measure its mineral resources.

== Civil War ==
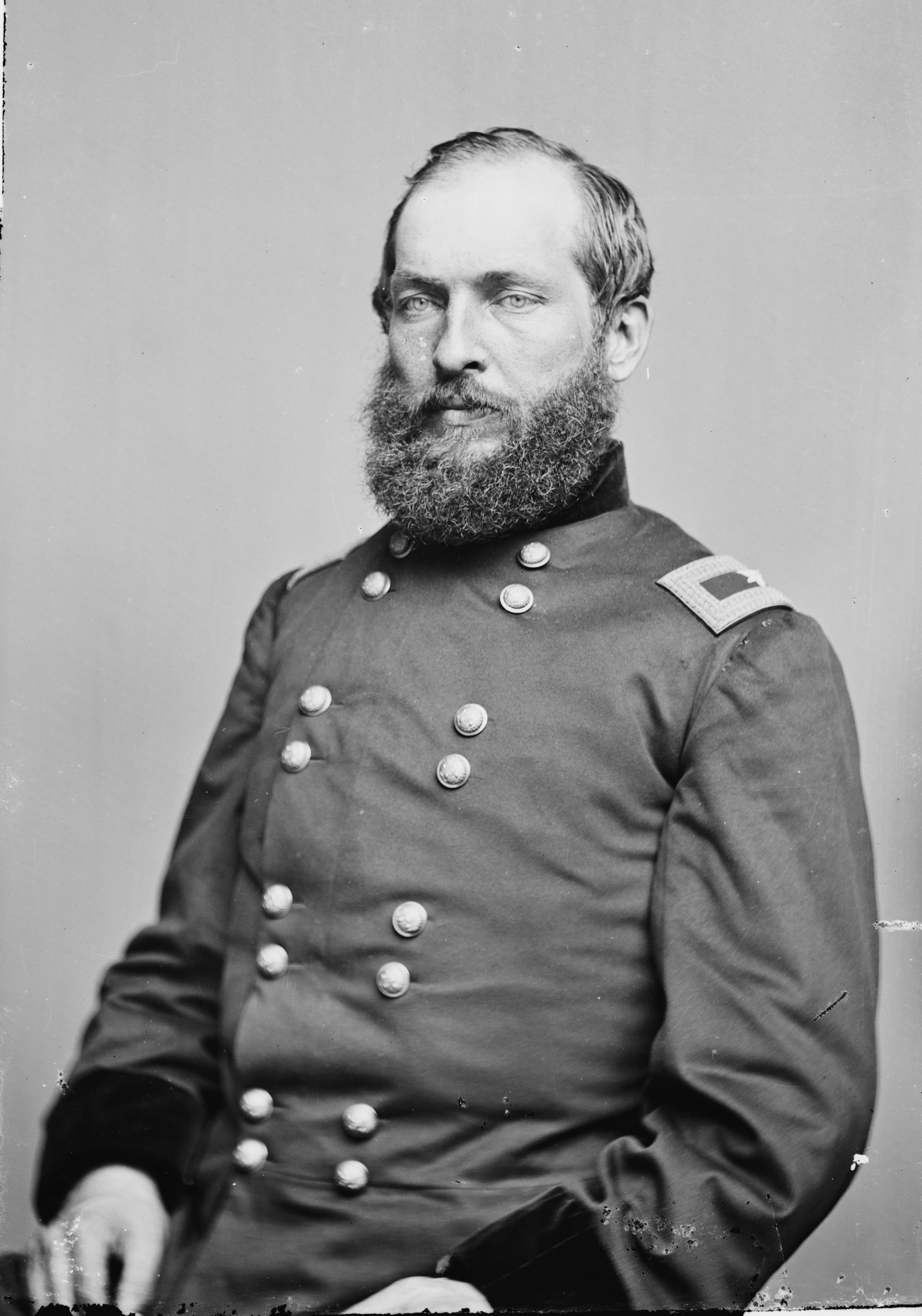
Garfield as a brigadier general during the Civil War

After Abraham Lincoln's election as president, several Southern states announced their secession from the Union to form a new government, the Confederate States of America. Garfield read military texts while anxiously awaiting the war effort, which he regarded as a holy crusade against the Slave Power. In April 1861, the rebels bombarded Fort Sumter, one of the South's last federal outposts, beginning the Civil War. Although he had no military training, Garfield knew his place was in the Union Army.

At Governor William Dennison's request, Garfield deferred his military ambitions to remain in the legislature, where he helped appropriate the funds to raise and equip Ohio's volunteer regiments. When the legislature adjourned, Garfield spent the spring and early summer on a speaking tour of northeastern Ohio, encouraging enlistment in the new regiments. Following a trip to Illinois to purchase muskets, Garfield returned to Ohio and, in August 1861, received a commission as a colonel in the 42nd Ohio Infantry regiment. The 42nd Ohio existed only on paper, so Garfield's first task was to fill its ranks. He did so quickly, recruiting many of his neighbors and former students. The regiment traveled to Camp Chase, outside Columbus, Ohio, to complete training. During this period, on November 19, 1861, Garfield became a Freemason, at Magnolia Lodge, No. 20 in Columbus, Ohio, receiving the third degree after his military service was completed in 1864. In December, Garfield was ordered to bring the 42nd to Kentucky, where they joined the Army of the Ohio under Brigadier General Don Carlos Buell.

=== Buell's command ===
Buell quickly assigned Garfield the task of driving Confederate forces out of eastern Kentucky, giving him the 18th Brigade for the campaign, which, besides his own 42nd, included the 40th Ohio Infantry, two Kentucky infantry regiments and two cavalry units. They departed Catlettsburg, Kentucky, in mid-December, advancing through the valley of the Big Sandy River. The march was uneventful until Union forces reached Paintsville, Kentucky, on January 6, 1862, where Garfield's cavalry engaged the rebels at Jenny's Creek. Confederate troops under Brigadier General Humphrey Marshall held the town in numbers roughly equal to Garfield's own, but Garfield positioned his troops so as to deceive Marshall into believing the rebels were outnumbered. Marshall ordered his troops to withdraw to the forks of Middle Creek, on the road to Virginia, and Garfield ordered his troops to take up the pursuit. They attacked the rebel positions on January 9, 1862, in the Battle of Middle Creek, the only pitched battle Garfield commanded personally. At the fighting's end, the Confederates withdrew from the field and Garfield sent his troops to Prestonsburg to reprovision.

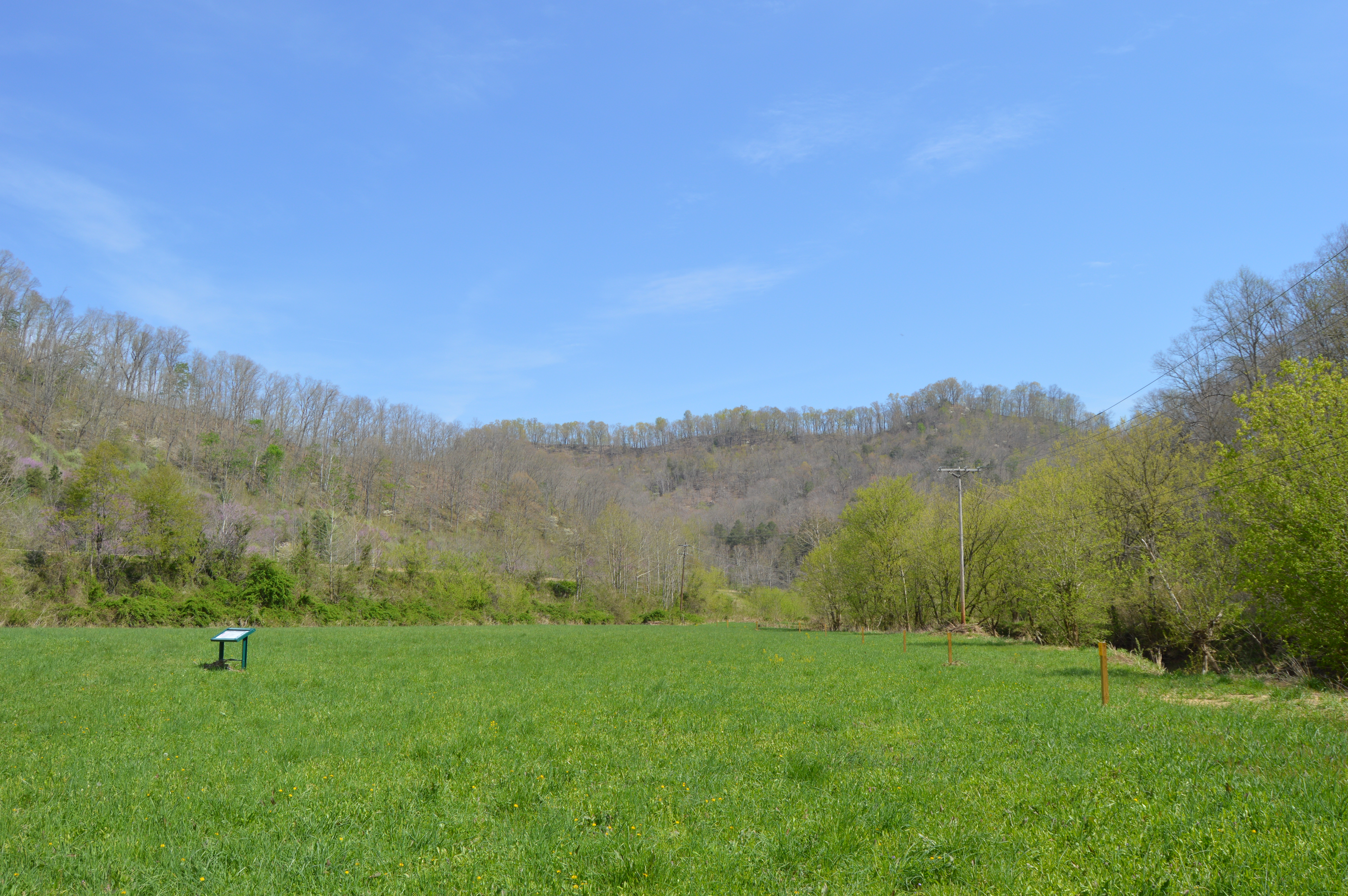
Middle Creek battlefield. Garfield commanded from the distant hill in the center of the photo.

In recognition of his success, Garfield was promoted to brigadier general. After Marshall's retreat, Garfield's command was the sole remaining Union force in eastern Kentucky and he announced that any men who had fought for the Confederacy would be granted amnesty if they returned to their homes, lived peaceably, and remained loyal to the Union. The proclamation was surprisingly lenient, as Garfield now believed the war was a crusade for eradication of slavery. Following a brief skirmish at Pound Gap, the last rebel units in the area were outflanked and retreated to Virginia.

Garfield's promotion gave him command of the 20th Brigade of the Army of the Ohio, which received orders to join Major General Ulysses S. Grant's forces as they advanced on Corinth, Mississippi, in early 1862. Before the 20th Brigade arrived, however, Confederate forces under General Albert Sidney Johnston surprised Grant's men in their camps, driving them back. Garfield's troops received word of the battle and advanced quickly, joining the rest of the army on the second day to drive the Confederates back across the field and into retreat. The action, later known as the Battle of Shiloh, was the bloodiest of the war to date; Garfield was exposed to fire for much of the day, but emerged uninjured. Major General Henry W. Halleck, Grant's superior, took charge of the combined armies and advanced ponderously toward Corinth; when they arrived, the Confederates had fled.

That summer, Garfield suffered from jaundice and significant weight loss. (Note: Biographer Allan Peskin speculated that he may have had infectious hepatitis instead.) He was forced to return home, where his wife nursed him back to health. While he was home, Garfield's friends worked to gain him the Republican nomination for Congress, but he refused to campaign with the delegates. He returned to military duty that autumn and went to Washington to await his next assignment. During this period of idleness, a rumor of an extramarital affair caused friction in the Garfields' marriage until Lucretia eventually chose to overlook it. Garfield repeatedly received tentative assignments that were quickly withdrawn, to his frustration. In the meantime, he served on the court-martial of Fitz John Porter for his tardiness at the Second Battle of Bull Run. He was convinced of Porter's guilt and voted with his fellow generals to convict Porter. The trial lasted almost two months, from November 1862 to January 1863, and, by its end, Garfield had procured an assignment as chief of staff to Major General William S. Rosecrans.

=== Chief of staff for Rosecrans ===
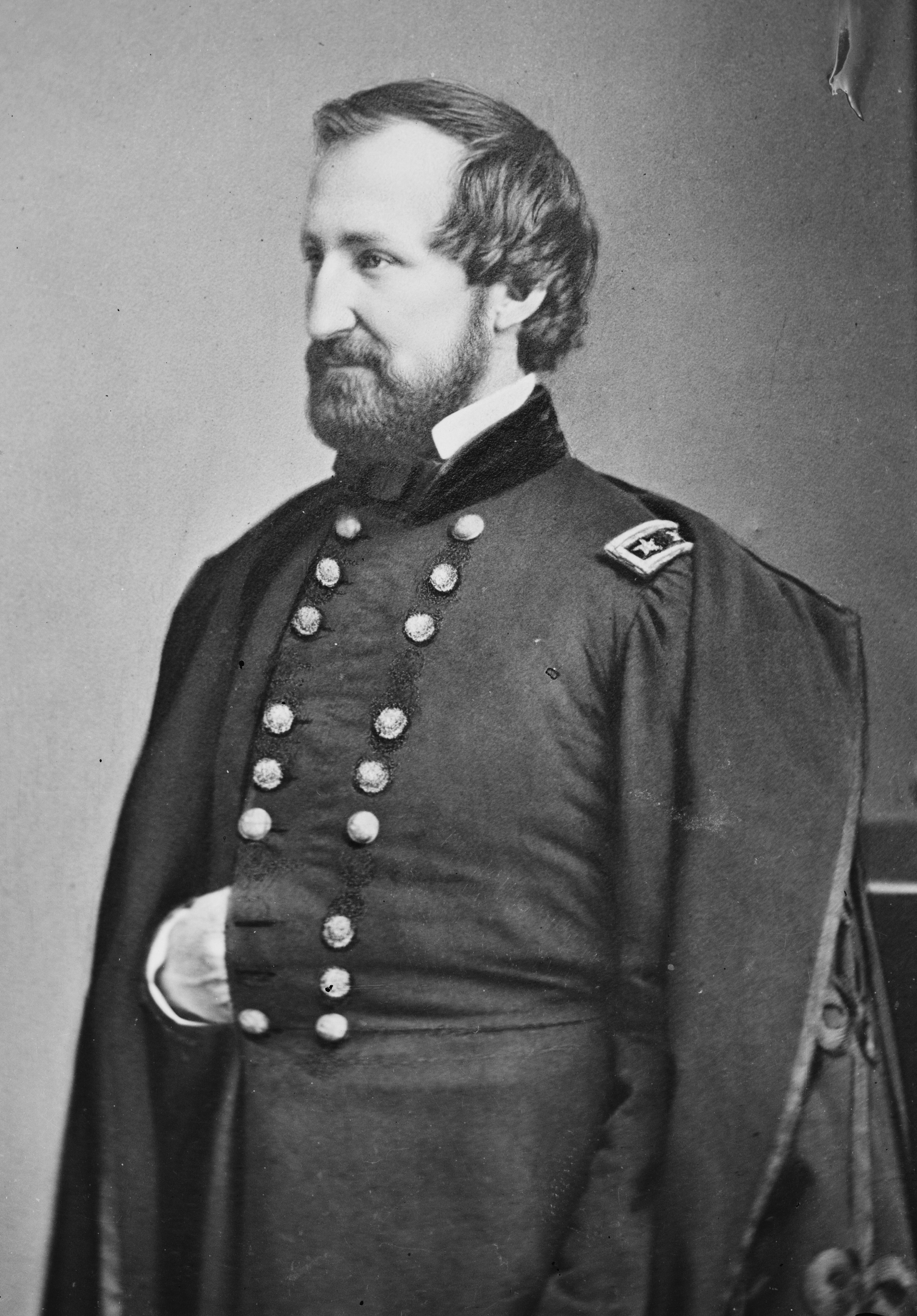
General William S. Rosecrans

Generals' chiefs of staff were usually more junior officers, but Garfield's influence with Rosecrans was greater than usual, with duties extending beyond communication of orders to actual management of his Army of the Cumberland. Rosecrans had a voracious appetite for conversation, especially when unable to sleep; in Garfield, he found "the first well read person in the Army" and the ideal candidate for discussions that ran deep into the night. They discussed everything, especially religion, and the two became close despite Garfield's being 12 years his junior. Rosecrans, who had converted from Methodism to Roman Catholicism, softened Garfield's view of his faith.

Garfield recommended that Rosecrans replace wing commanders Alexander McCook and Thomas Crittenden, as he believed they were ineffective, but Rosecrans ignored the suggestion. With Rosecrans, Garfield devised the Tullahoma Campaign to pursue and trap Confederate General Braxton Bragg in Tullahoma. After initial Union success, Bragg retreated toward Chattanooga, where Rosecrans stalled and requested more troops and supplies. Garfield argued for an immediate advance, in line with demands from Halleck and Lincoln. After a council of war and lengthy deliberations, Rosecrans agreed to attack.

At the ensuing Battle of Chickamauga on September 19 and 20, 1863, confusion among the wing commanders over Rosecrans's orders created a gap in the lines, resulting in a rout of the right flank. Rosecrans concluded that the battle was lost and fell back on Chattanooga to establish a defensive line. Garfield, however, thought part of the army had held and, with Rosecrans's approval, headed across Missionary Ridge to survey the scene. Garfield's hunch was correct. Consequently, his ride became legendary and Rosecrans's error reignited criticism about the latter's leadership. While Rosecrans's army had avoided disaster, they were stranded in Chattanooga, surrounded by Bragg's army. Garfield sent a telegram to Secretary of War Edwin M. Stanton alerting Washington to the need for reinforcements to avoid annihilation. Lincoln and Halleck responded to the request for reinforcements by sending 20,000 troops to Garfield by rail within nine days. In the meantime, Grant was promoted to command of the western armies and quickly replaced Rosecrans with George H. Thomas. Garfield was ordered to report to Washington, where he was promoted to major general. According to historian Jean Edward Smith, Grant and Garfield had a "guarded relationship" since Grant promoted Thomas, rather than Garfield, to command of the Army of the Cumberland after Rosecrans's dismissal.

== Congressional career ==
=== Election in 1862; Civil War years ===
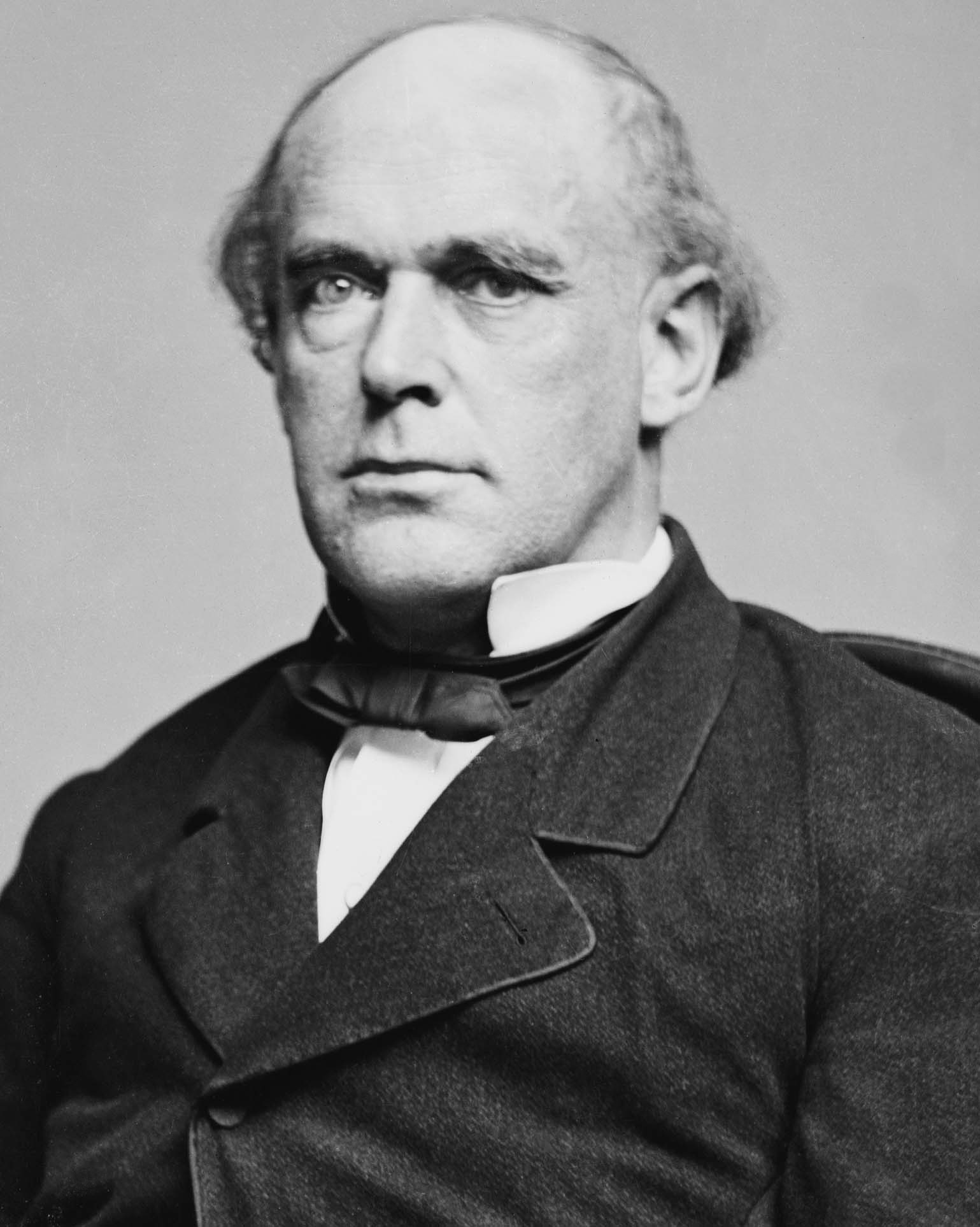
Salmon P. Chase was Garfield's ally until Andrew Johnson's impeachment trial.

While he served in the Army in early 1862, friends of Garfield approached him about running for Congress from Ohio's newly redrawn and heavily Republican 19th district. He worried that he and other state-appointed generals would receive obscure assignments, and running for Congress would allow him to resume his political career. That the new Congress would not hold its first regular session until December 1863 allowed him to continue his war service for a time. (Note: Until the ratification of the Twentieth Amendment in 1933, Congress convened annually in December.) Home on medical leave, he refused to campaign for the nomination, leaving that to political managers who secured it at the local convention in September 1862 on the eighth ballot. In the October general election, he defeated D.B. Woods by a two-to-one margin for a seat in the 38th Congress.

Days before his Congressional term began, Garfield lost his eldest daughter, three-year-old Eliza, and became anxious and conflicted, saying his "desolation of heart" might require his return to "the wild life of the army." He also assumed that the war would end before his joining the House, but it had not, and he felt strongly that he belonged in the field, rather than in Congress. He also thought he could expect a favorable command, so he decided to see President Lincoln. During their meeting, Lincoln recommended he take his House seat, as there was an excess of generals and a shortage of administration congressmen, especially those with knowledge of military affairs. Garfield accepted this recommendation and resigned his military commission to do so.

Garfield met and befriended Treasury Secretary Salmon P. Chase, who saw Garfield as a younger version of himself. The two agreed politically and both were part of the Radical wing of the Republican Party. Once he took his seat in December 1863, Garfield was frustrated at Lincoln's reluctance to press the South hard. Many radicals, led in the House by Pennsylvania's Thaddeus Stevens, wanted rebel-owned lands confiscated, but Lincoln threatened to veto any bill that proposed to do so on a widespread basis. In debate on the House floor, Garfield supported such legislation and, discussing England's Glorious Revolution, hinted that Lincoln might be thrown out of office for resisting it. Garfield had supported Lincoln's Emancipation Proclamation and marveled at the "strange phenomenon in the world's history, when a second-rate Illinois lawyer is the instrument to utter words which shall form an epoch memorable in all future ages."

Garfield not only favored the abolition of slavery, but also believed the leaders of the rebellion had forfeited their constitutional rights. He supported the confiscation of Southern plantations and even exile or execution of rebellion leaders as a means to ensure a permanent end to slavery. Garfield felt Congress had an obligation "to determine what legislation is necessary to secure equal justice to all loyal persons, without regard to color." He was more supportive of Lincoln when he took action against slavery.

Garfield showed leadership early in his congressional career; he was initially the only Republican vote to terminate the use of bounties in military recruiting. Some financially able recruits had used the bounty system to buy their way out of service (called commutation), which Garfield considered reprehensible. He gave a speech pointing out the flaws in the existing conscription law: 300,000 recruits had been called upon to enlist, but barely 10,000 had done so, with the remainder claiming exemption, providing money, or recruiting a substitute. Lincoln appeared before the Military Affairs committee on which Garfield served, demanding a more effective bill; even if it cost him reelection, Lincoln was confident he could win the war before his term expired. After many false starts, Garfield, with Lincoln's support, procured the passage of a conscription bill that excluded commutation.

Under Chase's influence, Garfield became a staunch proponent of a U.S. dollar backed by a gold standard, and strongly opposed the "greenback". He also accepted the necessity of suspension of payment in gold or silver during the Civil War with strong reluctance. He voted with the Radical Republicans in passing the Wade–Davis Bill, designed to give Congress more authority over Reconstruction, but Lincoln defeated it with a pocket veto.

Garfield did not consider Lincoln very worthy of reelection, but there seemed to be no viable alternative. "He will probably be the man, though I think we could do better", he said. Garfield attended the party convention and promoted Rosecrans as Lincoln's running mate, but delegates chose Military Governor of Tennessee Andrew Johnson. Lincoln was reelected, as was Garfield. By then, Chase had left the Cabinet and been appointed Chief Justice, and his relations with Garfield became more distant.

Garfield took up the practice of law in 1865 to improve his personal finances. His efforts took him to Wall Street where, the day after Lincoln's assassination, a riotous crowd drew him into an impromptu speech to calm their passions: "Fellow citizens! Clouds and darkness are round about Him! His pavilion is dark waters and thick clouds of the skies! Justice and judgment are the establishment of His throne! Mercy and truth shall go before His face! Fellow citizens! God reigns, and the Government at Washington still lives!" The speech, with no mention or praise of Lincoln, was, according to Garfield biographer Robert G. Caldwell, "quite as significant for what it did not contain as for what it did." In the following years, Garfield had more praise for Lincoln; a year after Lincoln's death, Garfield said, "Greatest among all these developments were the character and fame of Abraham Lincoln," and in 1878 he called Lincoln "one of the few great rulers whose wisdom increased with his power".

When in Washington, Garfield attended Vermont Avenue Christian Church, which later became National City Christian Church, a building constructed and funded by the Disciples.

=== Reconstruction ===
In 1864, the U.S. Senate passed the 13th Amendment, which abolished slavery throughout the Union. The bill failed to pass the House by a two-thirds majority until January 31, 1865, when it was then sent to the states for ratification. The Amendment opened other issues concerning African American civil rights. Garfield asked, "[What] is freedom? Is it the bare privilege of not being chained?...If this is all, then freedom is a bitter mockery, a cruel delusion." (Note: On June 13, 1868, the House passed the 14th Amendment that gave African Americans U.S. citizenship.)

Garfield supported black suffrage as firmly as he supported abolition. President Johnson sought the rapid restoration of the Southern states during the months between his accession and the meeting of Congress in December 1865; Garfield hesitantly supported this policy as an experiment. Johnson, an old friend, sought Garfield's backing and their talks led Garfield to assume Johnson's differences with Congress were not large. When Congress assembled in December (to Johnson's chagrin, without the elected representatives of the Southern states, who were excluded), Garfield urged conciliation to his colleagues, although he feared that Johnson, a former Democrat, might join other Democrats to gain political control. Garfield foresaw conflict even before February 1866, when Johnson vetoed a bill to extend the life of the Freedmen's Bureau, charged with aiding the former slaves. By April, Garfield had concluded that Johnson was either "crazy or drunk with opium."

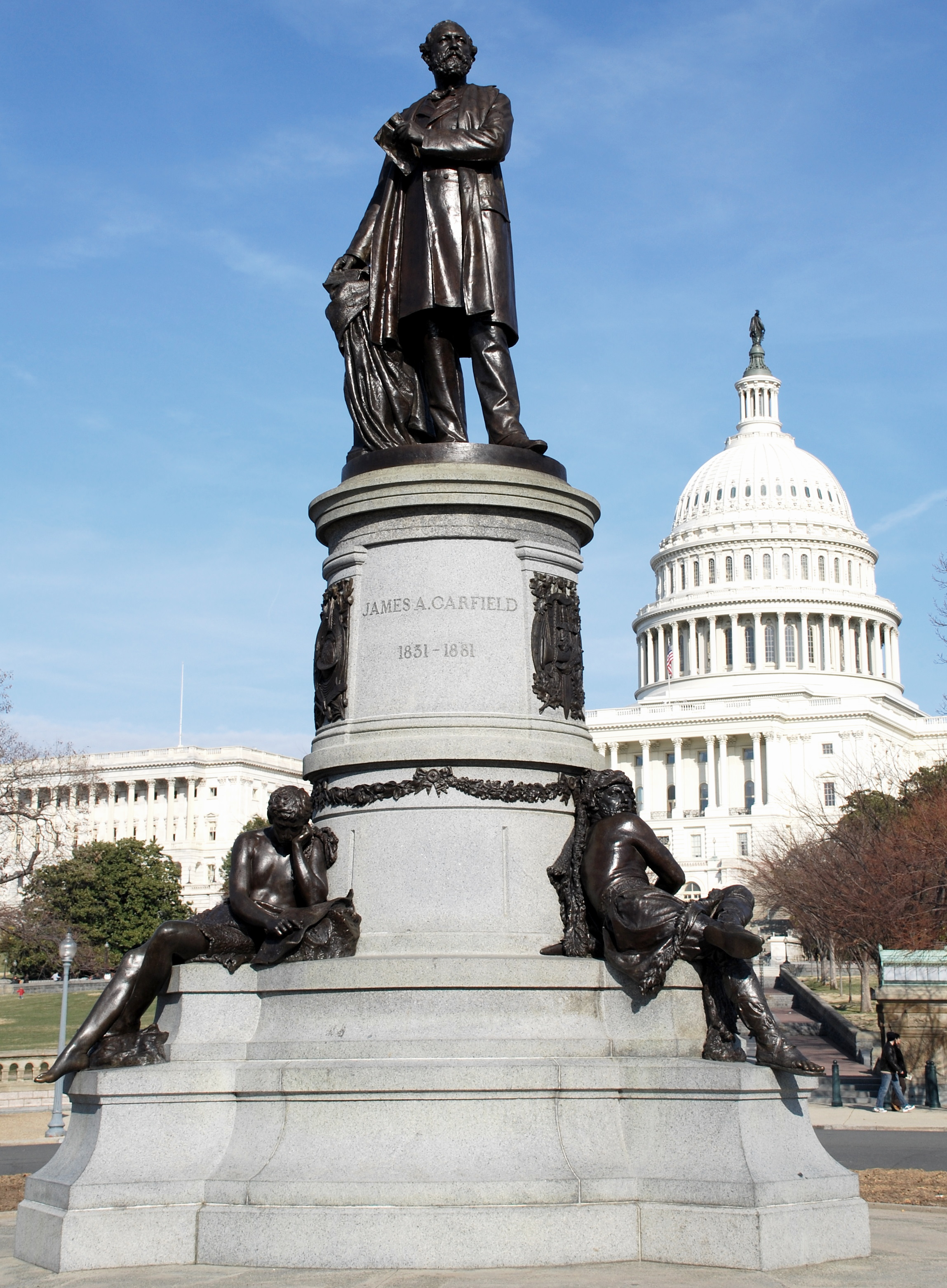
Garfield Monument, by the Capitol, where he served almost twenty years

The conflict between Congress and President Johnson was the major issue of the 1866 campaign, with Johnson taking to the campaign trail in a Swing Around the Circle and Garfield facing opposition within the Republican party in his home district. With the South still disenfranchised and Northern public opinion behind the Republicans, they gained a two-thirds majority in both houses of Congress. Garfield, having overcome his challengers at the district nominating convention, won reelection easily.

Garfield opposed the proposed impeachment of Johnson initially when Congress convened in December 1866, but supported legislation to limit Johnson's powers, such as the Tenure of Office Act, which restricted Johnson's ability to remove presidential appointees. Distracted by committee duties, Garfield spoke about these bills rarely, but was a loyal Republican vote against Johnson.

Garfield voted in support of the resolution that launched the first impeachment inquiry against Andrew Johnson (run by the House Committee on the Judiciary) on January 7, 1867. On December 7, he voted against the unsuccessful resolution to impeach Johnson that the House Committee on the Judiciary had sent the full House. On January 27, 1868, he voted to pass the resolution that authorized the second impeachment inquiry against Andrew Johnson (run by the House Select Committee on Reconstruction). Due to a court case, he was absent on February 24, 1868, when the House impeached Johnson, but gave a speech aligning himself with Thaddeus Stevens and others who sought Johnson's removal shortly thereafter. Garfield was present on March 2 and 3, 1868, when the House voted on specific articles of impeachment, and voted in support of all 11 articles. During the March 2 debate on the articles, Garfield argued that what he characterized as Johnson's attempts to render Ulysses S. Grant, William Tecumseh Sherman, and William H. Emory personal tools of his demonstrated intent to disregard the law and override the Constitution, suggesting that Johnson's trial perhaps could be expedited to last only a day in order to hasten his removal. When Johnson was acquitted in his trial before the Senate, Garfield was shocked and blamed the outcome on the trial's presiding officer, Chief Justice Chase, his onetime mentor.

By the time Grant succeeded Johnson in 1869, Garfield had moved away from the remaining radicals (Stevens, their leader, had died in 1868). By this time, many in the Republican Party wanted to remove the "Negro question" from national affairs. Garfield hailed the ratification of the 15th Amendment in 1870 as a triumph and favored Georgia's readmission to the Union as a matter of right, not politics. An influential Republican, Garfield said, "[The] Fifteen Amendment confers on the African race the care of its own destiny. It places their fortunes in their own hands." In 1871, Congress took up the Ku Klux Klan Act, which was designed to combat attacks on African Americans' suffrage rights. Garfield opposed the act, saying, "I have never been more perplexed by a piece of legislation." He was torn between his indignation at the Klan, whom he called "terrorists", and his concern for the power given to the president to enforce the act through suspension of habeas corpus.

=== Tariffs and finance ===
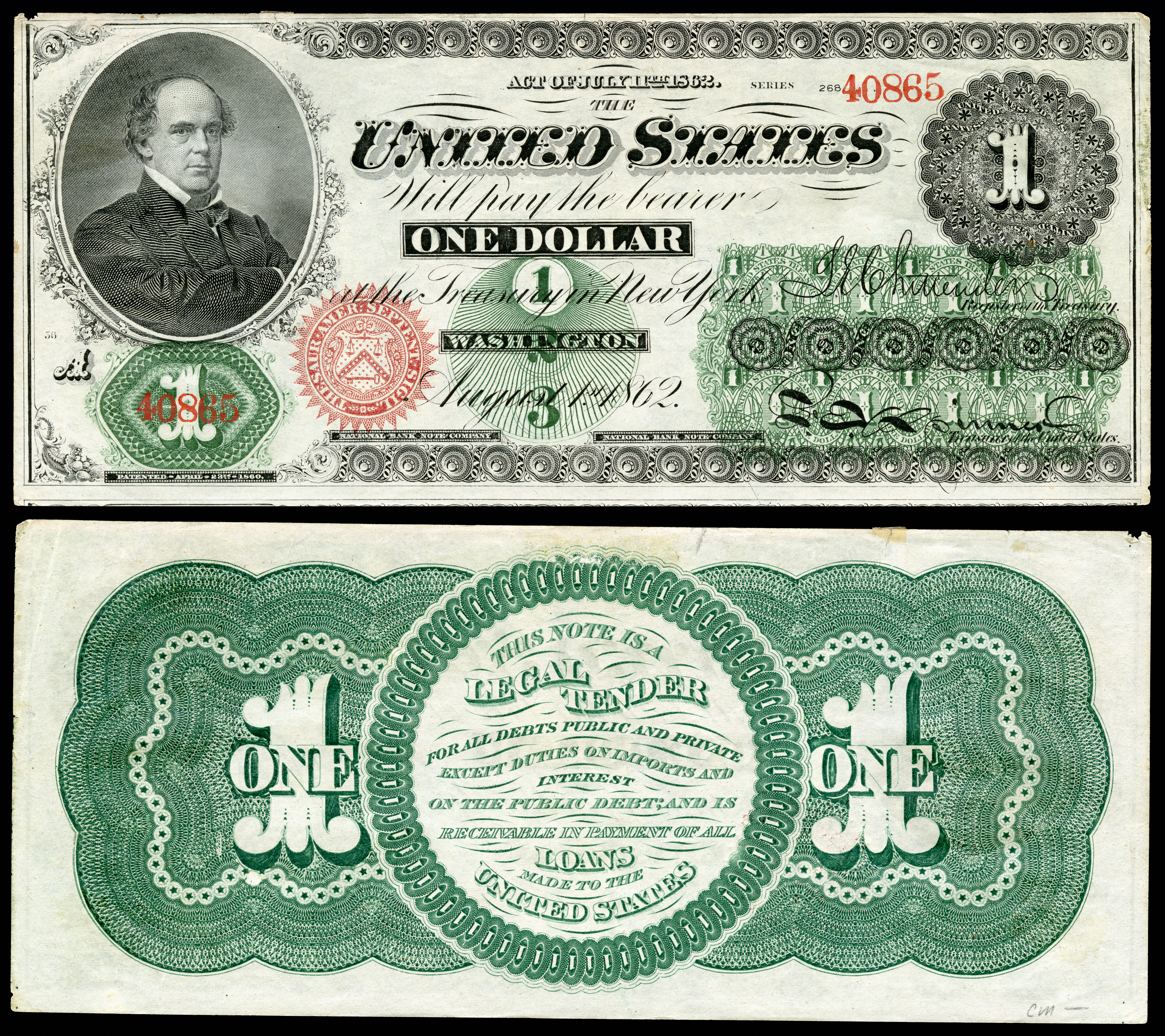
The greenback despised by Garfield

Throughout his political career, Garfield favored the gold standard and decried attempts to increase the money supply through the issuance of paper money not backed by gold, and later, through the free and unlimited coinage of silver. In 1865, he was put on the House Ways and Means Committee, a long-awaited opportunity to focus on financial and economic issues. He reprised his opposition to the greenback, saying, "Any party which commits itself to paper money will go down amid the general disaster, covered with the curses of a ruined people." In 1868 Garfield gave a two-hour speech on currency in the House, which was widely applauded as his best oratory to that point; in it, he advocated a gradual resumption of specie payments, that is, the government paying out silver and gold, rather than paper money that could not be redeemed.

Tariffs had been raised to high levels during the Civil War. Afterward, Garfield, who made a close study of financial affairs, advocated moving toward freer trade, though the standard Republican position was a protective tariff that would allow American industries to grow. This break with his party likely cost him his place on the Ways and Means Committee in 1867, and though Republicans held the majority in the House until 1875, Garfield remained off that committee. Garfield came to chair the powerful House Appropriations Committee, but it was Ways and Means, with its influence over fiscal policy, that he really wanted to lead. One reason he was denied a place on Ways and Means was the opposition of the influential Republican editor Horace Greeley.

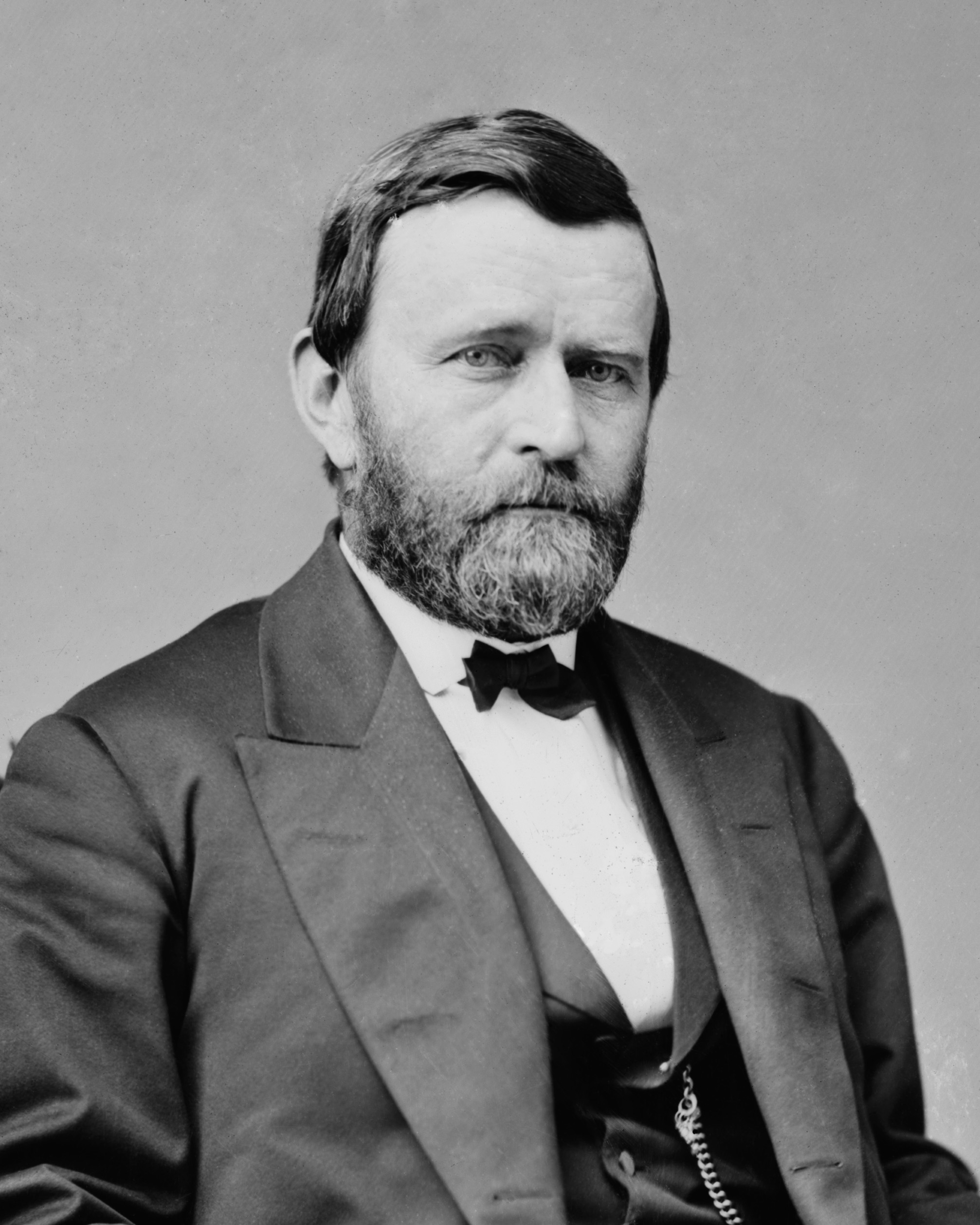
Portrait of Ulysses S. Grant

Starting in January 1870, Garfield, then chairman of the House Banking Committee, led an investigation into the Black Friday Gold Panic scandal. In 1869, during Grant's first term in office, two New York conspirators, Jay Gould and James Fisk, launched a scheme to corner the gold market. The conspiracy was broken on Friday, September 24, 1869, when Grant and Treasury Secretary George Boutwell released gold into the market, causing widespread financial panic. During the investigation, rumors spread that Grant's family might have been involved. In order not to force Grant's wife to testify, Garfield had a private meeting with Grant at the White House. When Garfield showed Grant testimony about him and his family, Grant thanked Garfield but refused to read it or give a response. Grant personally resented Garfield for investigating Black Friday and his wife Julia concerning possible involvement in the scandal.

Garfield's investigation and final majority report, released on September 12, 1870, were thorough but found no indictable offenses and exonerated Grant and Julia of wrongdoing. Garfield thought the scandal was enabled by the greenbacks that financed the speculation. Garfield was not at all enthused about President Grant's reelection in 1872—until Greeley, who emerged as the candidate of the Democrats and Liberal Republicans, became the only serious alternative. Garfield said, "I would say Grant was not fit to be nominated and Greeley is not fit to be elected." Both Grant and Garfield were overwhelmingly reelected.

=== Crédit Mobilier scandal; salary grab ===
The Crédit Mobilier of America scandal involved corruption in the financing of the Union Pacific Railroad, part of the transcontinental railroad which was completed in 1869. Union Pacific officers and directors secretly purchased control of the Crédit Mobilier of America company, then contracted with it to undertake construction of the railroad. The railroad paid the company's grossly inflated invoices with federal funds appropriated to subsidize the project, and the company was allowed to purchase Union Pacific securities at par value, well below the market rate. Crédit Mobilier showed large profits and stock gains, and distributed substantial dividends. The high expenses meant Congress was called upon to appropriate more funds. One of the railroad officials who controlled Crédit Mobilier was also a congressman, Oakes Ames of Massachusetts. He offered some of his colleagues the opportunity to buy Crédit Mobilier stock at par value, well below what it sold for on the market, and the railroad got its additional appropriations.

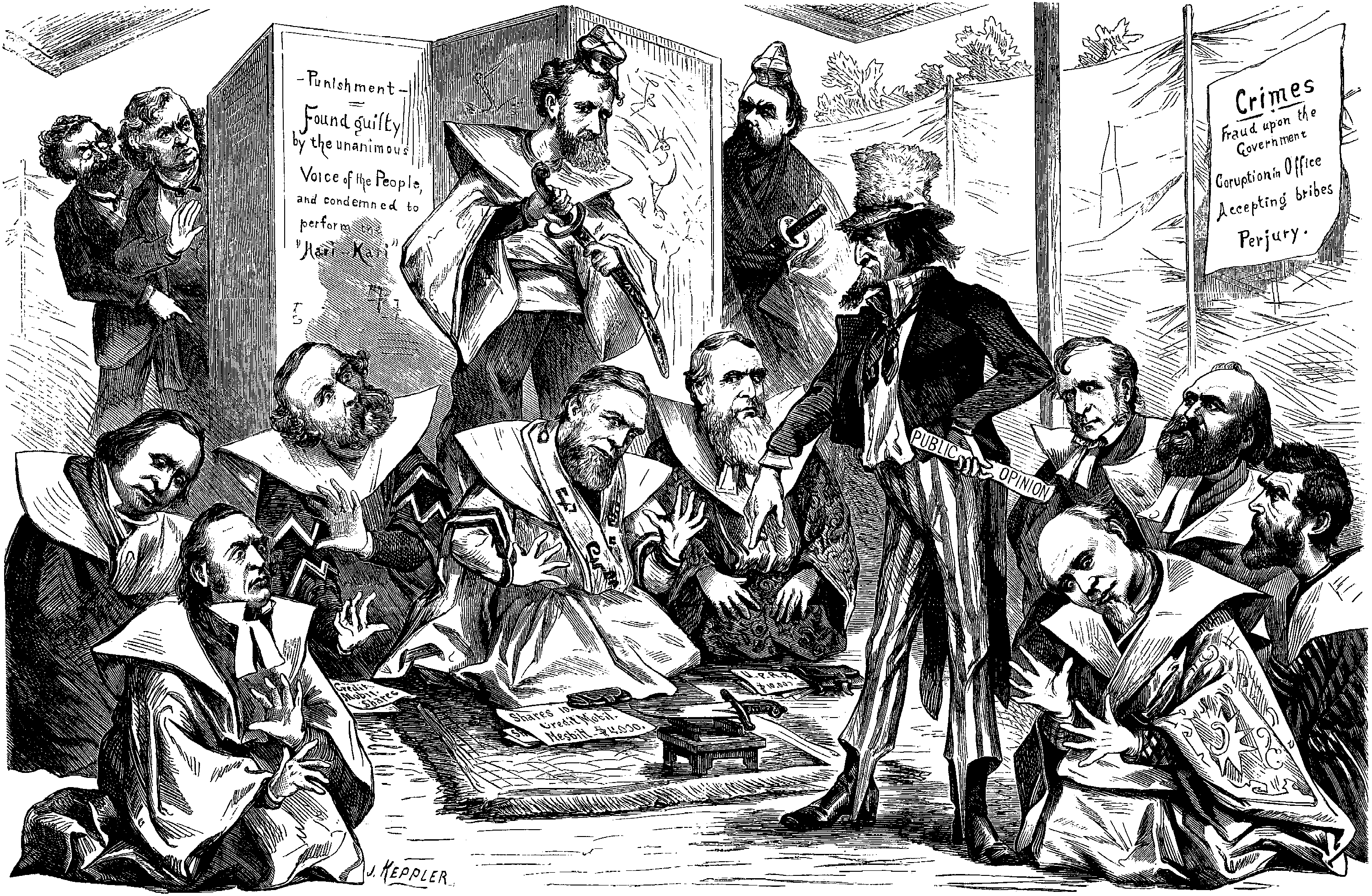
Editorial cartoon: Uncle Sam directs U.S. Senators and Representatives implicated in the Crédit Mobilier scheme to commit Hara-Kiri.

The story broke in July 1872, in the middle of the presidential campaign. Among those named were Vice President Schuyler Colfax, Massachusetts Senator Henry Wilson (the Republican candidate for vice president), Speaker James G. Blaine of Maine, and Garfield. Greeley had little luck taking advantage of the scandal. When Congress reconvened after the election, Blaine, seeking to clear his name, demanded a House investigation. Evidence before the special committee exonerated Blaine. Garfield had said in September 1872 that Ames had offered him stock but he had repeatedly refused it. Testifying before the committee in January, Ames said he had offered Garfield ten shares of stock at par value, but that Garfield had never taken them or paid for them, though a year passed, from 1867 to 1868, before Garfield had finally refused. Appearing before the committee on January 14, 1873, Garfield confirmed much of this. Ames testified several weeks later that Garfield agreed to take the stock on credit, and that it was paid for by the company's huge dividends. The two men differed over $300 that Garfield received and later paid back, with Garfield deeming it a loan and Ames a dividend.

Garfield's biographers have been unwilling to exonerate him in the scandal. Allan Peskin writes, "Did Garfield lie? Not exactly. Did he tell the truth? Not completely. Was he corrupted? Not really. Even Garfield's enemies never claimed that his involvement in the affair influenced his behavior." Rutkow writes, "Garfield's real offense was that he knowingly denied to the House investigating committee that he had agreed to accept the stock and that he had also received a dividend of $329." Caldwell suggests Garfield "told the truth [before the committee, but] certainly failed to tell the whole truth, clearly evading an answer to certain vital questions and thus giving the impression of worse faults than those of which he was guilty." That Crédit Mobilier was a corrupt organization had been a badly kept secret, even mentioned on the floor of Congress, and editor Sam Bowles wrote at the time that Garfield, in his positions on committees dealing with finance, "had no more right to be ignorant in a matter of such grave importance as this, than the sentinel has to snore on his post."

Another issue that caused Garfield trouble in his 1874 reelection bid was the so-called "Salary Grab" of 1873, which increased the compensation for members of Congress by 50%, retroactive to 1871. As chairman of the Appropriations Committee, Garfield was responsible for shepherding the appropriations bill through the House; during the debate in February 1873, Massachusetts Representative Benjamin Butler offered the increase as an amendment, and despite Garfield's opposition, it passed the House and eventually became law. The law was very popular in the House, as almost half the members were lame ducks, but the public was outraged, and many of Garfield's constituents blamed him, though he personally refused to accept the increase. In a bad year for Republicans, who lost control of the House for the first time since the Civil War, Garfield had his closest congressional election, winning with only 57% of the vote. (Note: Garfield typically won two or three times his Democratic opponents' votes.)

=== Floor leader; Hayes administration ===
The Democratic takeover of the House of Representatives in 1875 meant the loss of Garfield's chairmanship of the Appropriations Committee, though the Democrats did put him on the Ways and Means Committee. With many of his leadership rivals defeated in the 1874 Democratic landslide, and Blaine elected to the Senate, Garfield was seen as the Republican floor leader, and the likely Speaker, should the party regain control of the chamber.

Garfield thought the land grants given to expanding railroads was an unjust practice. He also opposed monopolistic practices by corporations, as well as the power sought by workers' unions. He supported the proposed establishment of the United States civil service as a means of ridding officials of the annoyance of aggressive office seekers. He especially wished to eliminate the practice of forcing government workers, in exchange for their positions, to kick back a percentage of their wages as political contributions.

As the 1876 presidential election approached, Garfield was loyal to the candidacy of Senator Blaine, and fought for the former Speaker's nomination at the 1876 Republican National Convention in Cincinnati. When it became clear, after six ballots, that Blaine could not prevail, the convention nominated Ohio Governor Rutherford B. Hayes. Although Garfield had supported Blaine, he had kept good relations with Hayes, and wholeheartedly supported the governor. Garfield had hoped to retire from politics after his term expired to devote himself full-time to the practice of law, but to help his party, he sought re-election, and won it easily that October. Any celebration was short-lived, as Garfield's youngest son, Neddie, fell ill with whooping cough shortly after the congressional election, and soon died.

Garfield (second from right in the row of commissioners just below the gallery) served on the Electoral Commission that decided the disputed 1876 presidential election. Painting by Cornelia Adele Strong Fassett.

When Hayes appeared to have lost the presidential election the following month to Democrat Samuel Tilden, the Republicans launched efforts to reverse the results in South Carolina, Louisiana, and Florida, where they held the governorship. If Hayes won all three states, he would take the election by a single electoral vote. Grant asked Garfield to serve as a "neutral observer" of the recount in Louisiana. The observers soon recommended to the state electoral commissions that Hayes be declared the winner—Garfield recommended the entire vote of West Feliciana Parish, which had given Tilden a sizable majority, be thrown out. The Republican governors of the three states certified that Hayes had won their states, to the outrage of Democrats, who had the state legislatures submit rival returns, and threatened to prevent the counting of the electoral vote—under the Constitution, Congress is the final arbiter of the election. Congress then established an Electoral Commission, consisting of eight Republicans and seven Democrats, to determine the winner. Despite his objection to the Commission, Garfield was appointed to it. He felt Congress should count the vote and proclaim Hayes victorious. Hayes emerged the victor by a party line vote of 8–7. In exchange for recognizing Hayes as president, Southern Democrats secured the removal of federal troops from the South, ending Reconstruction.

Although an Ohio Senate seat would be vacated by the resignation of John Sherman to become Treasury Secretary, Hayes needed Garfield's expertise to protect him from the agenda of a hostile Congress, and asked him not to seek it. Garfield agreed. As Hayes's key legislator in the House, he gained considerable prestige and respect for his role there. When Congress debated the Bland–Allison Act, to have the government purchase large quantities of silver and strike it into legal tender dollar coins, Garfield opposed it as a deviation from the gold standard; it was enacted over Hayes's veto in February 1878.

In 1876, Garfield purchased the property in Mentor that reporters later dubbed Lawnfield, where he later conducted the first successful front porch campaign for the presidency. Hayes suggested that Garfield run for governor in 1879, seeing that as a road likely to take Garfield to the White House. Garfield preferred to seek election as a U.S. senator. Rivals were spoken of for the seat, such as Secretary Sherman, but he had presidential ambitions (for which he sought Garfield's support), and other candidates fell by the wayside. The General Assembly elected Garfield to the Senate in January 1880, though his term was not scheduled to commence until March 4, 1881.

=== Legal career and other activities ===
In 1865, Garfield became a partner in the law firm of Jeremiah Black. They had much in common, except politics: Black was an avid Democrat, having served in the cabinet of President James Buchanan. The next year, Black was retained by some pro-Confederate northern civilians who had been found guilty of treason in a military court and sentenced to death. Black saw an opportunity to strike a blow against military courts and the Republicans. He had heard Garfield's military speeches, and learned of not only his oratory skills but also his resistance to expansive powers of military commissions. Black assigned the case to Garfield one week before arguments were to be made before the U. S. Supreme Court. When Black warned him of the political peril, Garfield responded, "It don't make any difference. I believe in English liberty and English law." In this landmark case, Ex parte Milligan, Garfield successfully argued that civilians could not be tried before military tribunals, despite a declaration of martial law, as long as civil courts were still operating. In his first court appearance, Garfield's oral argument lasted over two hours, and though his wealthy clients refused to pay him, he had established himself as a preeminent lawyer.

During Grant's first term, Garfield was discontented with public service and in 1872 again pursued opportunities in the law. But he declined a partnership offer from a Cleveland law firm when told his prospective partner was of "intemperate and licentious" reputation. In 1873, after Chase's death, Garfield appealed to Grant to appoint Justice Noah H. Swayne Chief Justice, but Grant appointed Morrison R. Waite.

Garfield's proof of the Pythagorean theorem features a right triangle within a trapezoid.

In 1871, Garfield traveled to Montana Territory to negotiate the removal of the Bitterroot Salish tribe to the Flathead Indian Reservation. Having been told that the people would happily move, Garfield expected an easy task. Instead, he found the Salish determined to stay in their Bitterroot Valley homeland. His attempts to coerce Chief Charlo to sign the agreement nearly brought about a military clash. In the end, he convinced two subchiefs to sign and move to the reservation with a few of the Salish people. Garfield never convinced Charlo to sign, although the official treaty document voted on by Congress bore his forged mark.

In 1876, Garfield developed a trapezoid proof of the Pythagorean theorem, which was published in the New England Journal of Education. Mathematics historian William Dunham wrote that Garfield's trapezoid work was "really a very clever proof." According to the Journal, Garfield arrived at the proof "in mathematical amusements and discussions with other members of congress."

After his conversion experience in 1850, religious inquiry was a high priority for Garfield. He read widely and moved beyond the confines of his early experience as a member of the Disciples of Christ. His new, broader perspective was rooted in his devotion to freedom of inquiry and his study of history. The intensity of Garfield's religious thought was also influenced by his experience in combat and his interaction with voters.

== Presidential election of 1880 ==
=== Republican nomination ===
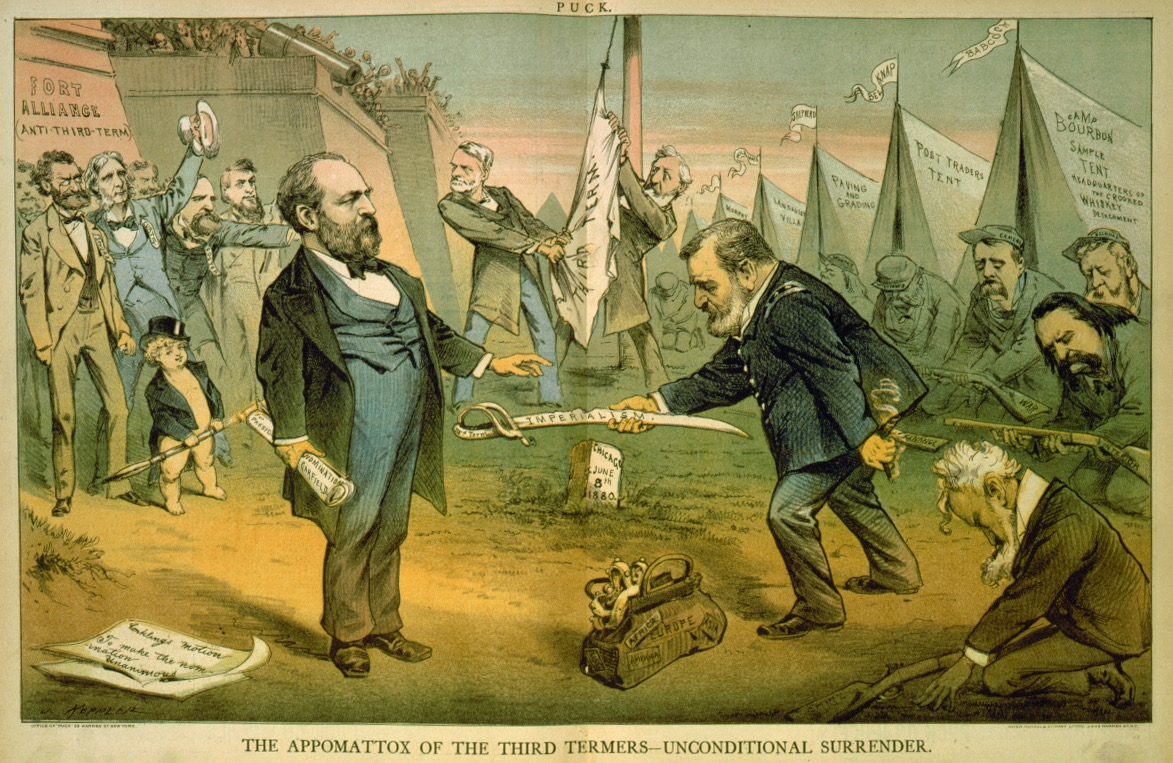
Following Grant's defeat for the nomination Puck magazine satirized Robert E. Lee's surrender to him at Appomattox by depicting Grant giving up his sword to Garfield.

Having just been elected to the U.S. Senate with John Sherman's support, Garfield was committed to Sherman for the 1880 Republican presidential nomination. Before the convention began, however, a few Republicans, including Wharton Barker of Philadelphia, thought Garfield the best choice for the nomination. Garfield denied any interest in the position, but the attention was enough to make Sherman suspicious of his lieutenant's ambitions. Besides Sherman, the early favorites for the nomination were Blaine and former President Grant; several other candidates attracted delegates as well.

The Republican Party at the time was split into two factions: the "Stalwarts", who supported the existing federal government patronage system, and the "Half-Breeds", who wanted civil service reform. As the convention began, New York Senator Roscoe Conkling, floor leader for the Stalwarts, who supported former President Ulysses S. Grant, proposed that the delegates pledge to back the eventual nominee in the general election. When three West Virginia delegates declined to be so bound, Conkling sought to expel them from the convention. Garfield rose to defend the men, giving a passionate speech in defense of their right to reserve judgment. The crowd turned against Conkling, and he withdrew the motion. The performance delighted Garfield's boosters, who were then convinced he was the only one who could attract a majority of the delegates' votes.

Following the initial convention business, Conkling took the stage to present his candidate, Ulysses S. Grant, electrifying the crowd in a speech repeatedly interrupted by cheers, leading most reporters to believe Grant would win the nomination immediately by acclamation. Garfield then took the stage to nominate his fellow Ohioan, John Sherman, delivering a calm address that reminded the delegates the presidential election would be decided "at the ballot-boxes in the Republic" in November rather than "in Chicago in the heat of July". Garfield's speech focused on the delegates' right to vote their conscience rather than being controlled by party bosses; Garfield was seen as embodying the integrity the public desired amid widespread political exhaustion and corruption. Focus shifted to Garfield, prompting one delegate to remark, "If any outsider is taken, I hope it will be Garfield". The first ballot showed Grant with 304 votes, Blaine with 284, and Sherman in a distant third with 93. Subsequent ballots were deadlocked between Grant and Blaine, with neither having the 379 votes needed for nomination. Jeremiah McLain Rusk, a member of the Wisconsin delegation, and Benjamin Harrison, an Indiana delegate, sought to break the deadlock by shifting a few of the anti-Grant votes to a dark horse candidate—Garfield. Garfield gained 50 votes on the 35th ballot, and a stampede began. Garfield protested to the Ohio delegation that he did not seek the nomination and would not betray Sherman, but they overruled his objections and voted for him. On the next ballot, nearly all the Sherman and Blaine delegates shifted their support to Garfield, giving him 399 votes and the nomination. Most of Grant's supporters backed him to the end, creating a disgruntled Stalwart minority in the party. To obtain that faction's support for the ticket, Chester A. Arthur, a former New York customs collector and member of Conkling's political machine, was nominated for vice president. Levi P. Morton was initially offered the vice-presidential nomination, but declined after consulting with Conkling.

=== Campaign against Hancock ===
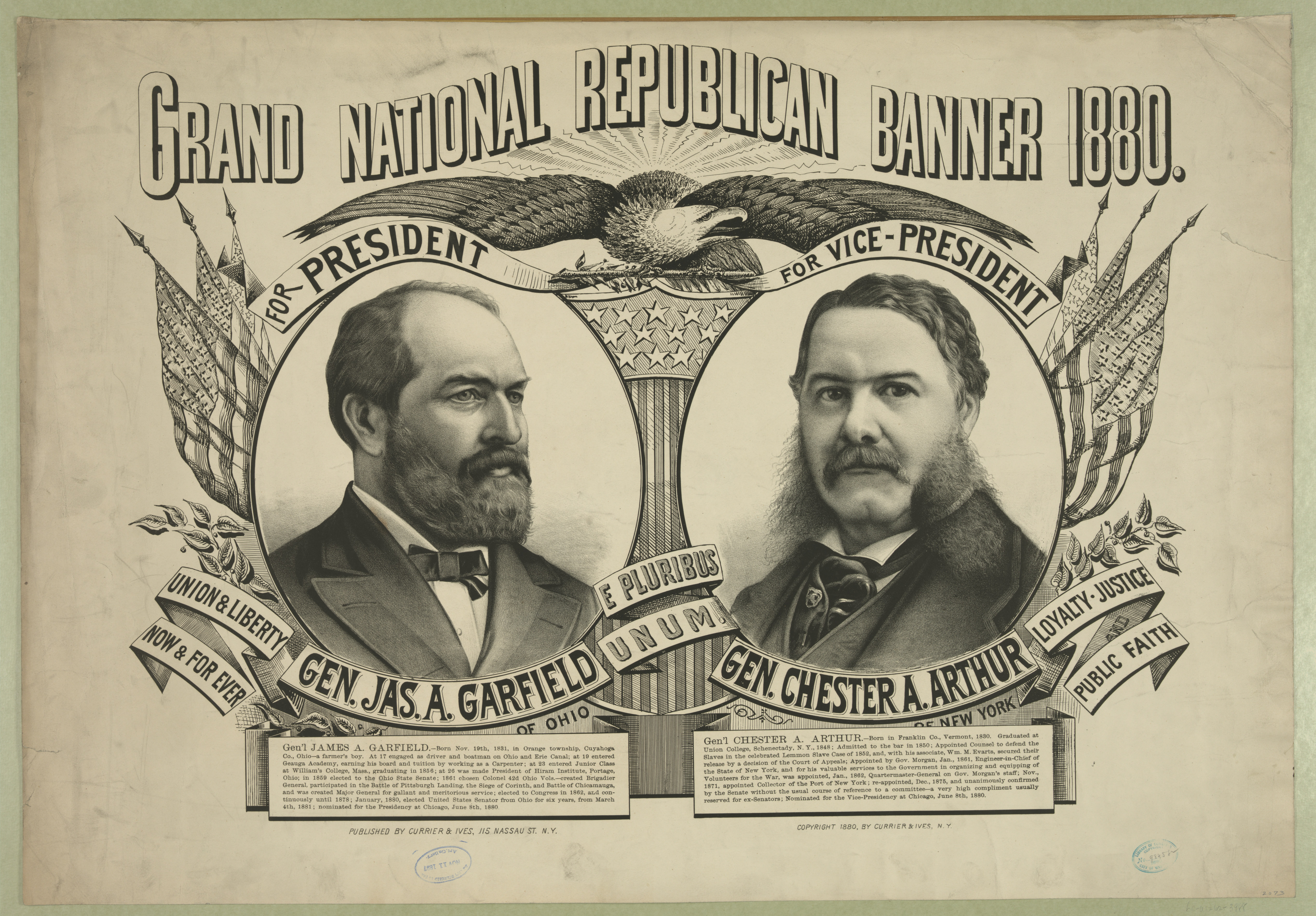
Garfield–Arthur election poster

1880 electoral vote results

Even with a Stalwart on the ticket, animosity between the Republican factions carried over from the convention, so Garfield traveled to New York to meet with party leaders. After convincing the Stalwart crowd to put aside their differences and unite for the coming campaign, Garfield returned to Ohio, leaving the active campaigning to others, as was traditional at the time. Meanwhile, the Democrats settled on their nominee, Major General Winfield Scott Hancock of Pennsylvania, a career military officer. Hancock and the Democrats expected to carry the Solid South, while much of the North was considered safe territory for Garfield and the Republicans; most of the campaign focused on a few close states, including New York and Indiana.

Practical differences between the candidates were few, but Republicans began the campaign with the familiar theme of waving the bloody shirt. They reminded Northern voters the Democratic Party was responsible for secession and four years of civil war, and Democrats would reverse the gains of that war, dishonor Union veterans, and pay Confederate veterans pensions out of the federal treasury. Fifteen years had passed since the end of the war, and with Union generals at the head of both tickets, the bloody shirt was of diminishing value in exciting the voters. With a few months to go before the election, the Republicans switched tactics to emphasize the tariff. Seizing on the Democratic platform's call for a "tariff for revenue only", Republicans told Northern workers a Hancock presidency would weaken the tariff protection that kept them in good jobs. Hancock made the situation worse when, attempting to strike a moderate stance, he said, "The tariff question is a local question." The Republican ploy proved effective in uniting the North behind Garfield. Ultimately, of the more than 9.2 million popular votes cast, fewer than 2,000 separated the two candidates. But in the Electoral College, Garfield had an easy victory over Hancock, 214 to 155. The election made Garfield the only sitting member of the House ever to be elected to the presidency.

== Presidency (1881) ==
- Presidency of James A. Garfield; March 4, 1881 – September 19, 1881
- Vice President: Chester A. Arthur
- Party: Republican
- Election: 1880
- Seat: White House
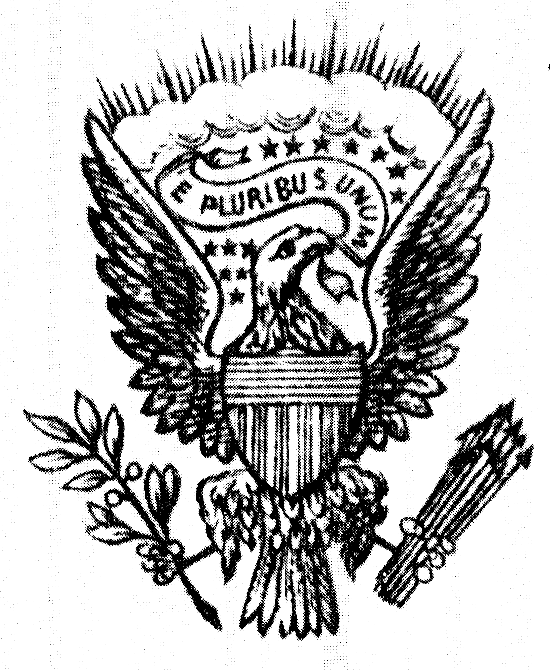
- Presidential coat of arms (1877–1913)

Garfield cabinet
Office	Name	Term
President	James A. Garfield	1881
Vice President	Chester A. Arthur	1881
Secretary of State	James G. Blaine	1881
Secretary of the Treasury	William Windom	1881
Secretary of War	Robert Todd Lincoln	1881
Attorney General	Wayne MacVeagh	1881
Postmaster General	Thomas Lemuel James	1881
Secretary of the Navy	William H. Hunt	1881
Secretary of the Interior	Samuel J. Kirkwood	1881

=== Cabinet and inauguration ===
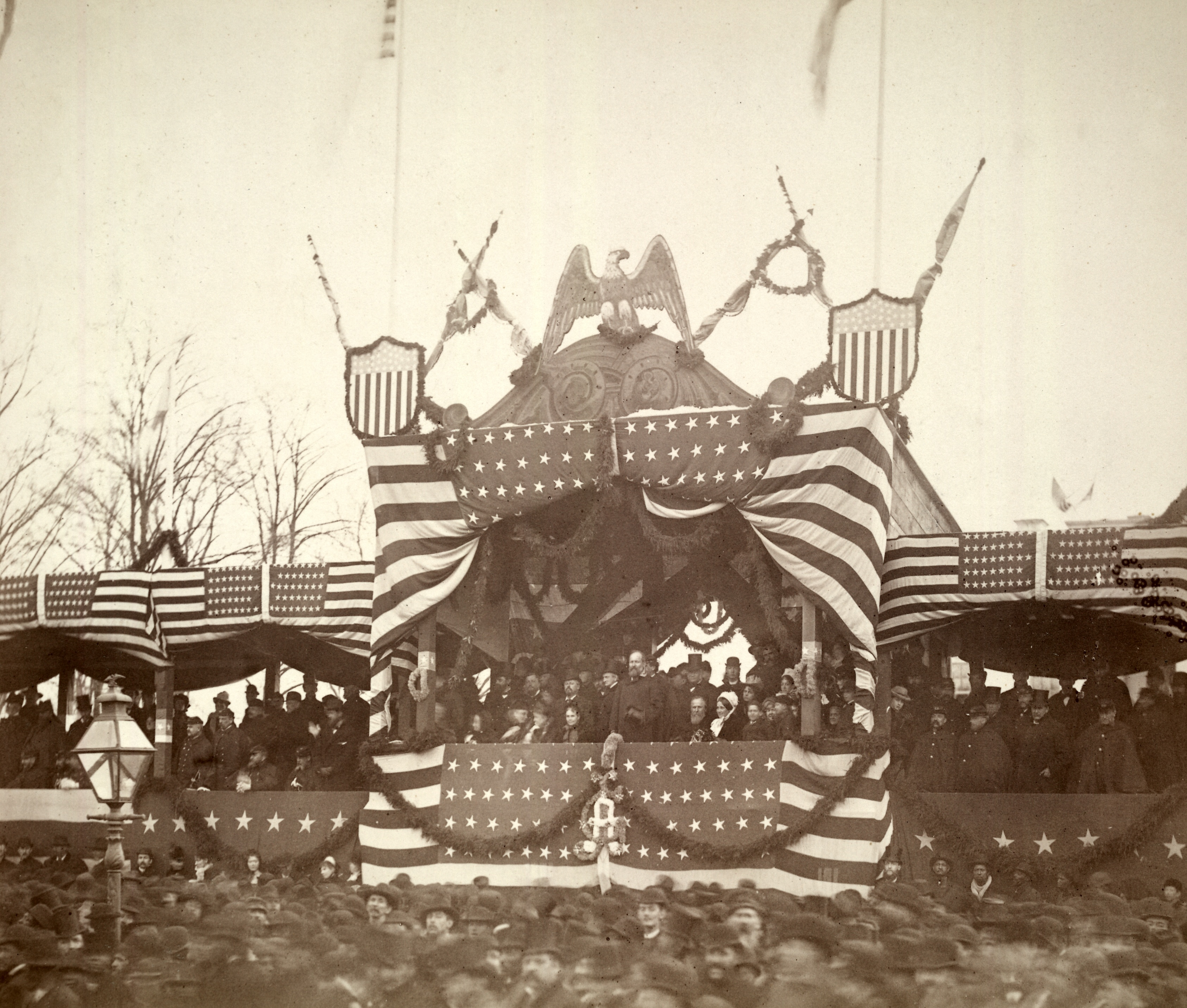
President Garfield in reviewing stand, viewing inauguration ceremonies, on March 4, 1881

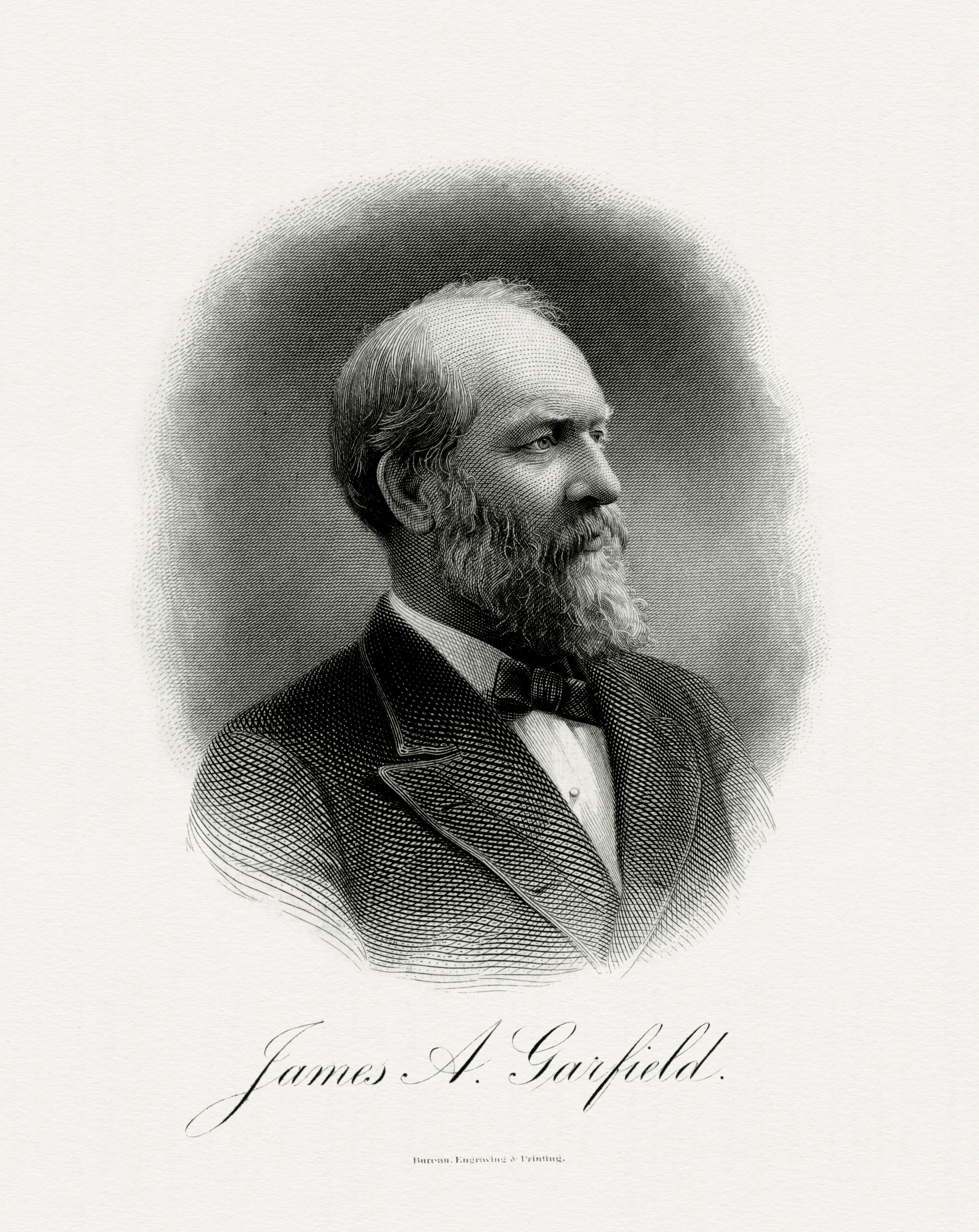
Line engraving of Garfield, produced around 1902 by the Bureau of Engraving and Printing as part of a presentation album of the first 26 presidents

Before his inauguration, Garfield was occupied with assembling a cabinet that might engender peace between the party's Conkling and Blaine factions. Blaine's delegates had provided much of the support for Garfield's nomination, so the Maine senator received the place of honor as Secretary of State. Blaine was not only the president's closest advisor, but he was also obsessed with knowing all that took place in the White House, and allegedly posted spies there in his absence. Garfield nominated William Windom of Minnesota as Secretary of the Treasury, William H. Hunt of Louisiana as Secretary of the Navy, Robert Todd Lincoln as Secretary of War, and Samuel J. Kirkwood of Iowa as Secretary of the Interior. New York was represented by Thomas Lemuel James as Postmaster General. Garfield appointed Pennsylvania's Wayne MacVeagh, an adversary of Blaine's, as Attorney General. Blaine tried to sabotage the appointment by convincing Garfield to name an opponent of MacVeagh, William E. Chandler, as Solicitor General under MacVeagh. Only Chandler's rejection by the Senate forestalled MacVeagh's resignation over the matter.

Because Garfield was distracted by cabinet maneuvering, his inaugural address was a "compendium of platitudes" and fell below expectations. At one high point, however, Garfield emphasized the civil rights of African Americans, saying "Freedom can never yield its fullness of blessings so long as the law or its administration places the smallest obstacle in the pathway of any virtuous citizen." After discussing the gold standard, the need for education, and an unexpected denunciation of Mormon polygamy, the speech ended. The crowd applauded, but the speech, according to Peskin, "however sincerely intended, betrayed its hasty composition by the flatness of its tone and the conventionality of its subject matter."

Garfield's appointment of James infuriated Conkling, a factional opponent of the Postmaster General, who demanded a compensatory appointment for his faction, such as the position of Secretary of the Treasury. The resulting squabble occupied much of Garfield's brief presidency. The feud with Conkling reached a climax when the president, at Blaine's instigation, nominated Conkling's enemy, Judge William H. Robertson, to be Collector of the Port of New York. This was one of the prize patronage positions below cabinet level and was then held by Edwin A. Merritt. Conkling raised the time-honored principle of senatorial courtesy in an attempt to defeat the nomination, to no avail. Garfield, who believed the practice was corrupt and refused to rubber-stamp selections by powerful senators, did not back down and threatened to withdraw all nominations unless Robertson was confirmed, intending to "settle the question whether the president is registering clerk of the Senate or the Executive of the United States". Ultimately, Conkling and his New York colleague Senator Thomas C. Platt resigned their Senate seats to seek vindication but found only further humiliation when the New York legislature elected others in their places. Robertson was confirmed as Collector and Garfield's victory was clear. To Blaine's chagrin, Garfield returned to his goal of balancing the interests of party factions and nominated a number of Conkling's Stalwart friends to offices.

With his cabinet complete, Garfield had to contend with myriad office seekers. He exclaimed, "My God! What is there in this place that a man should ever get into it." Garfield's family happily settled into the White House, but he found presidential duties exasperating.

=== Refinance of national debt ===
Garfield ordered Treasury Secretary William Windom to refund (refinance) the national debt by calling in outstanding U.S. bonds paying 6% interest. Holders would have the option of accepting cash or new bonds at 3%, closer to the interest rates of the time. Taxpayers were saved an estimated $10 million. By comparison, federal expenditures in 1881 were below $261 million (~$7.48 billion in 2025).

=== Supreme Court nomination ===
In 1880, President Hayes had nominated Stanley Matthews to the Supreme Court but the Senate declined to act on the nomination. In March 1881, Garfield re-nominated Matthews to the Court and the Senate confirmed Matthews by a vote of 24–23. According to The New York Times, "opposition to Matthews's Supreme Court appointment ... stemmed from his prosecution in 1859 of a newspaper editor who had assisted two runaway slaves." Because Matthews was "a professed abolitionist at the time, the matter was later framed as political expediency triumphing over moral principle." Matthews served on the Court until his death in 1889.

=== Reforms ===
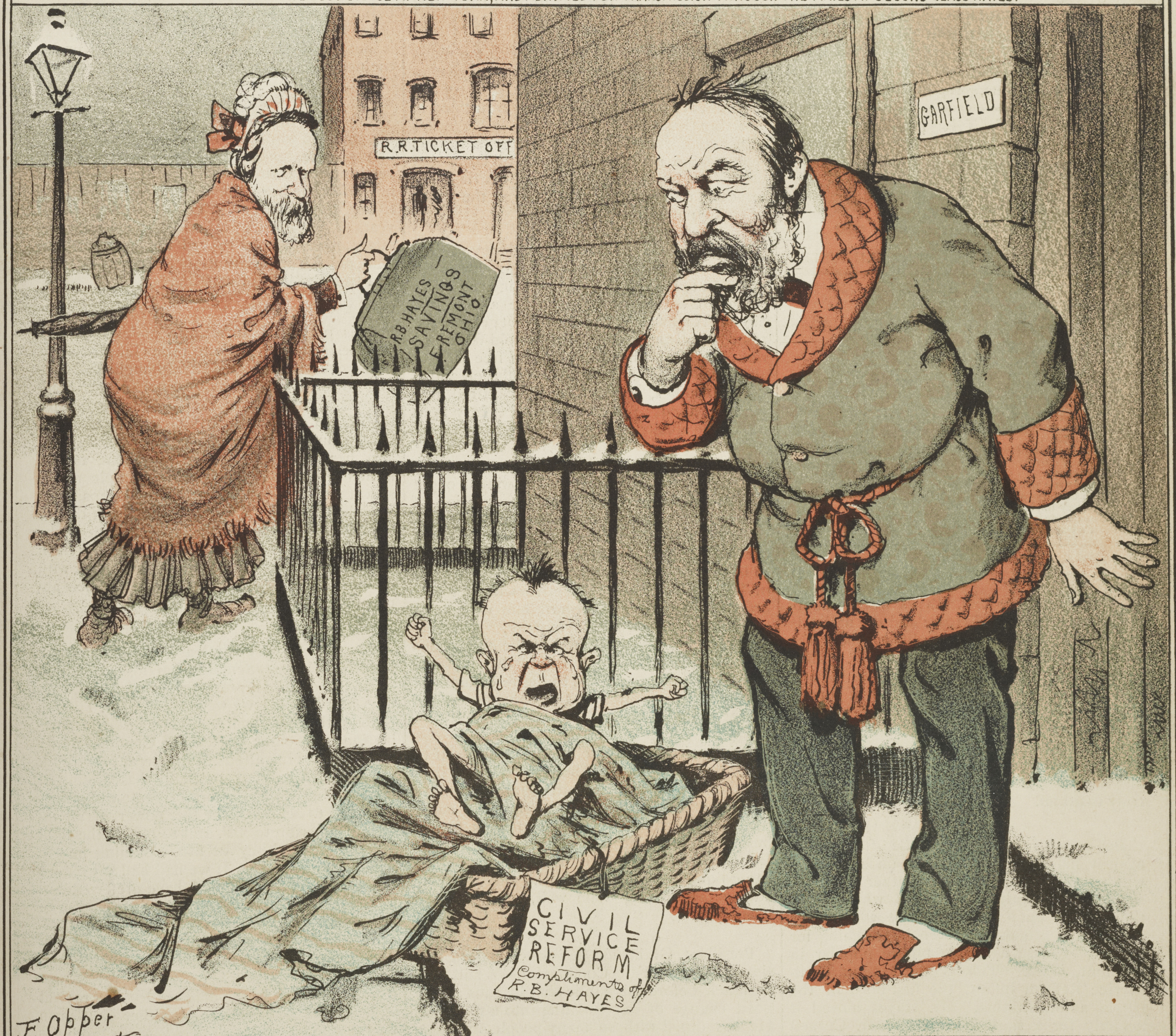
An 1881 Puck cartoon shows Garfield finding a baby at his front door with a tag marked "Civil Service Reform, compliments of R.B. Hayes". Hayes, his predecessor in the presidency, is seen in the background dressed like a woman and holding a bag marked "R.B. Hayes' Savings, Fremont, Ohio".

Grant and Hayes had both advocated civil service reform, and by 1881 such reform associations had organized with renewed energy across the nation. Garfield sympathized with them, believing the spoils system damaged the presidency and often eclipsed more important concerns. Some reformers became disappointed when Garfield promoted limited tenure only to minor office seekers and gave appointments to his old friends.

Corruption in the post office also cried out for reform. In April 1880, there had been a congressional investigation of corruption in the Post Office Department, where profiteering rings allegedly stole millions of dollars, securing bogus mail contracts on star routes. After obtaining contracts with the lowest bid, costs to run the mail routes would be escalated and profits would be divided among ring members. Shortly after taking office, Garfield received word of postal corruption by an alleged star route ringleader, Assistant Postmaster General Thomas J. Brady. Garfield demanded Brady's resignation and ordered prosecutions that ended in trials for conspiracy. When told that his party, including his campaign manager, Stephen W. Dorsey, was involved, Garfield directed that the corruption in the Post Office be rooted out "to the bone", regardless of where it might lead. Brady resigned and was indicted for conspiracy, though jury trials in 1882 and 1883 found Brady not guilty.

=== Civil rights and education ===
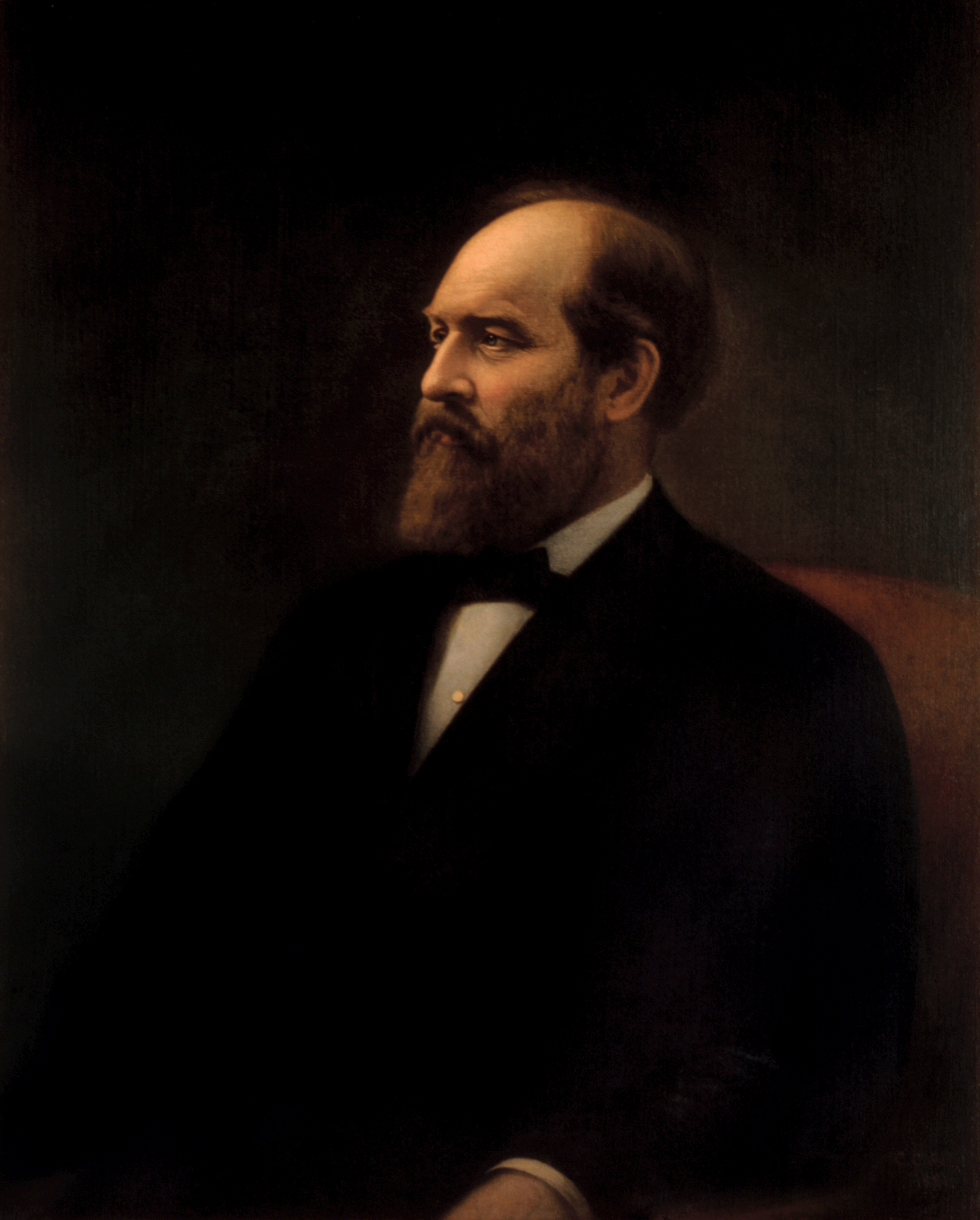
Official White House portrait of James Garfield, 1881

Garfield believed the key to improving the state of African American civil rights was government supported education. During Reconstruction, freedmen had gained citizenship and suffrage, which enabled them to participate in government, but Garfield believed their rights were being eroded by Southern white resistance and illiteracy, and he was concerned that black people would become America's permanent "peasantry". He proposed a "universal" education system funded by the federal government. In February 1866, as a congressman from Ohio, Garfield and Ohio School Commissioner Emerson Edward White had drafted a bill for the National Department of Education. They believed that through the use of statistics they could push the U.S. Congress to establish a federal agency for school reform. But by the time of Garfield's presidency, Congress and the northern white public had lost interest in African-American rights, and Congress did not pass federal funding for universal education during his term.

Garfield also worked to appoint several African Americans to prominent positions: Frederick Douglass, recorder of deeds in Washington; Robert Elliot, special agent to the Treasury; John M. Langston, Haitian minister; and Blanche K. Bruce, register to the Treasury. Garfield believed Southern support for the Republican Party could be gained by "commercial and industrial" interests rather than race issues and began to reverse Hayes's policy of conciliating Southern Democrats. He appointed William H. Hunt, a Republican from Louisiana, as Secretary of the Navy. To break the hold of the resurgent Democratic Party in the Solid South, Garfield took patronage advice from Virginia Senator William Mahone of the biracial independent Readjuster Party, hoping to add the independents' strength to the Republicans' there.

=== Foreign policy and naval reform ===
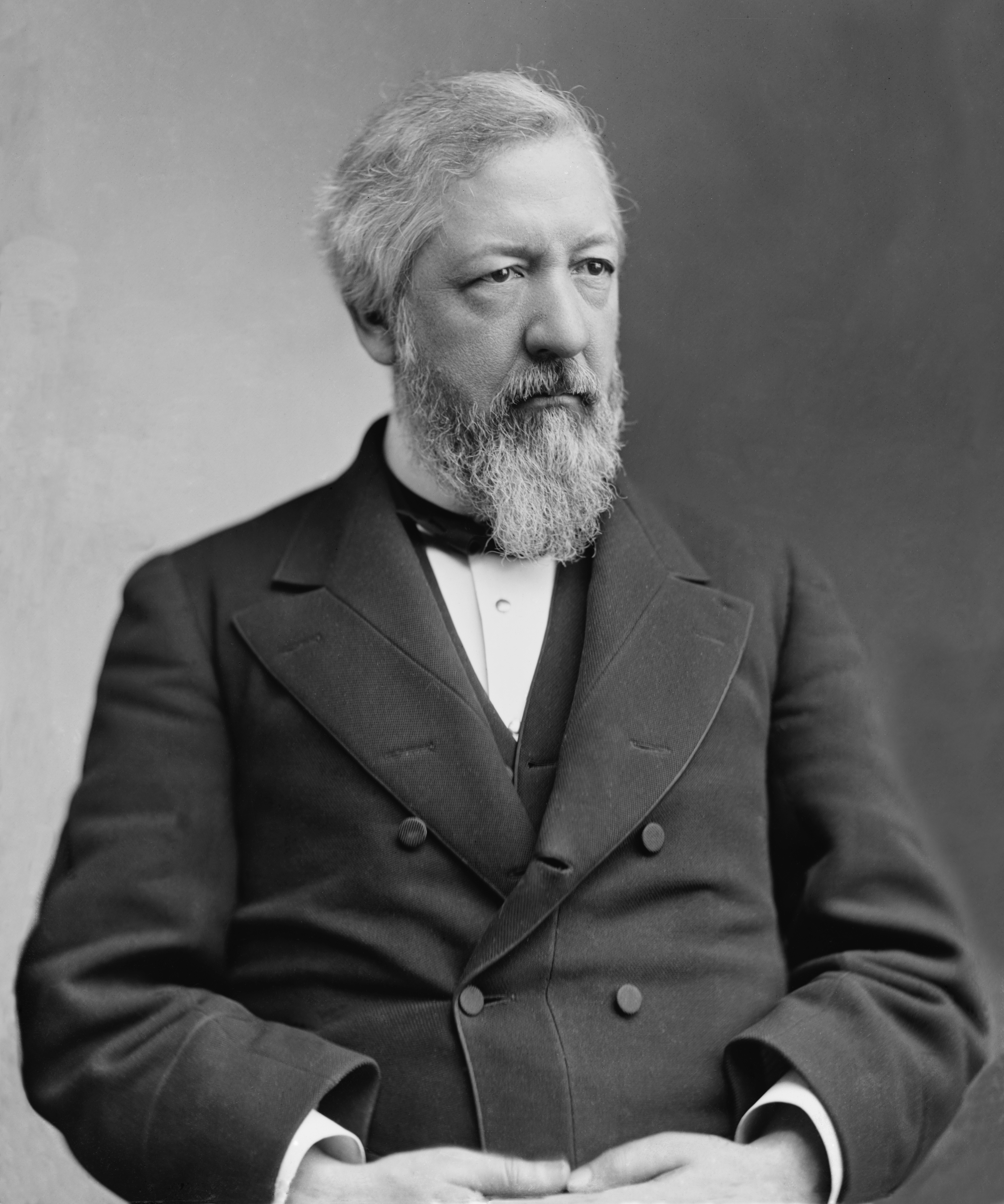
James G. Blaine, Garfield's Secretary of State

Garfield had little foreign policy experience, so he leaned heavily on Blaine. They agreed on the need to promote free trade, especially within the Western Hemisphere. Garfield and Blaine believed increasing trade with Latin America would be the best way to keep the United Kingdom from dominating the region. By encouraging exports, they believed they could increase American prosperity. Garfield authorized Blaine to call for a Pan-American conference in 1882 to mediate disputes among the Latin American nations and to serve as a forum for talks on increasing trade.

At the same time, they hoped to negotiate a peace in the War of the Pacific then being fought by Bolivia, Chile, and Peru. Blaine favored a resolution that would result in Peru yielding no territory, but Chile by 1881 had occupied the Peruvian capital of Lima, and rejected any settlement that restored the previous status quo.

Garfield sought to expand American influence in other areas, calling for renegotiation of the Clayton–Bulwer Treaty to allow the United States to construct a canal through Panama without British involvement and attempting to reduce British influence in the strategically located Kingdom of Hawaii. Garfield's and Blaine's plans for the United States' involvement in the world stretched even beyond the Western Hemisphere, as he sought commercial treaties with Korea and Madagascar.

Garfield also considered increasing U.S. military strength abroad, asking Navy Secretary Hunt to investigate the navy's condition with an eye toward expansion and modernization. In the end, these ambitious plans came to nothing after Garfield was assassinated. Nine countries had accepted invitations to the Pan-American conference, but the invitations were withdrawn in April 1882 after Blaine resigned from the cabinet and Arthur, Garfield's successor, canceled the conference. (Note: In October 1883, the War of the Pacific was settled without American involvement, with the Treaty of Ancón.) Naval reform continued under Arthur, on a more modest scale than Garfield and Hunt had envisioned, ultimately ending in the construction of the Squadron of Evolution.

=== Political views ===
As president, Garfield opposed labor unions and sided with the Republican Party's hard-money wing. He was also suspicious of cooperative farm programs supported by the Grange, a farmers' organization he called "communism in disguise". But Garfield also opposed corporate monopoly and advocated a federal education department along with increased federal support for the education of African Americans in southern states.

Another study has said of Garfield:

No man could be in politics as long as Garfield had been without forming some opinions of the nature of presidential leadership, and his, by and large, were negative. Philosophically, as has been noted, he was a believer in laissez-faire, and he had been suspicious of presidential power from the time when he fought Andrew Johnson.

Garfield's successor as president, Chester A. Arthur, shared his laissez-faire views.

== Assassination ==
=== Guiteau and shooting ===
Charles J. Guiteau had followed various professions in his life, but in 1880 had determined to gain federal office by supporting what he expected would be the winning Republican ticket. He composed a speech, "Garfield vs. Hancock", and got it printed by the Republican National Committee. One means of persuading the voters in that era was through orators expounding on the candidate's merits, but with the Republicans seeking more famous men, Guiteau received few opportunities to speak. On one occasion, according to Kenneth D. Ackerman, Guiteau was unable to finish his speech due to nerves. Guiteau, who considered himself a Stalwart, deemed his contribution to Garfield's victory sufficient to justify his appointment to the position of consul in Paris, despite the fact that he spoke no French, nor any foreign language. One medical expert has since described Guiteau as possibly a narcissistic schizophrenic; neuroscientist Kent Kiehl assessed him as a clinical psychopath.

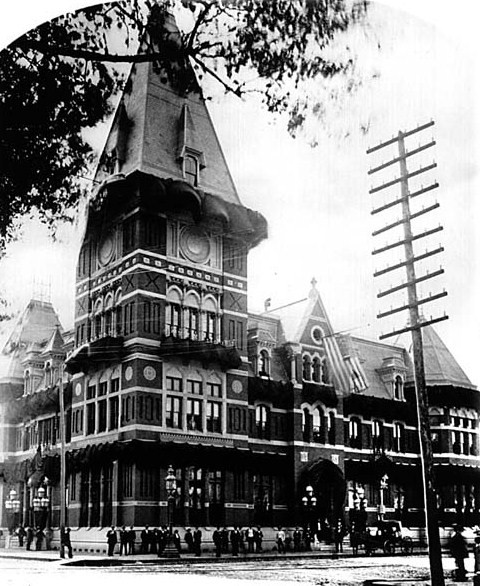
Baltimore and Potomac Railroad Station in Washington, D.C., where Garfield was shot July 2, 1881

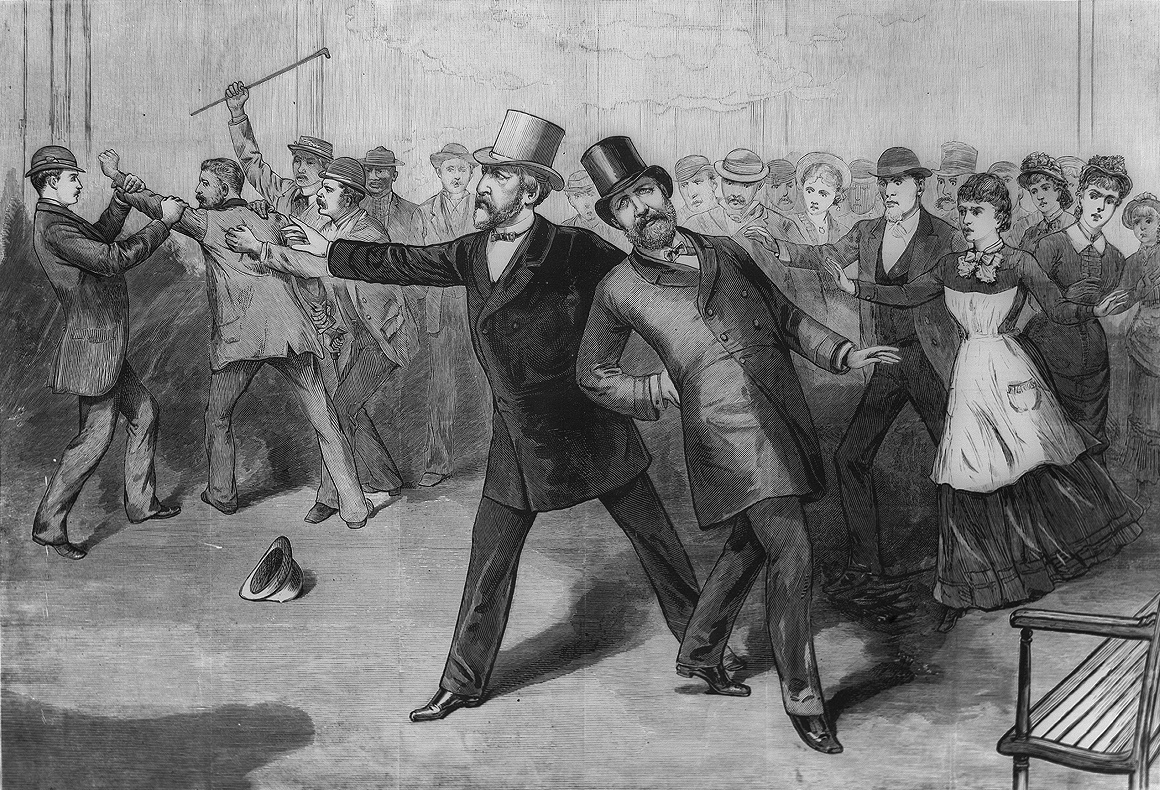
Garfield, shot by Charles J. Guiteau, collapses as Secretary of State Blaine gestures for help. Engraving from Frank Leslie's Illustrated Newspaper.

One of Garfield's more wearying duties was seeing office-seekers, and he saw Guiteau at least once. White House officials suggested to Guiteau that he approach Blaine, as the consulship was within the Department of State. Blaine also saw the public regularly, and Guiteau became a regular at these sessions. Blaine, who had no intention of giving Guiteau a position he was unqualified for and had not earned, simply said the deadlock in the Senate over Robertson's nomination made it impossible to consider the Paris consulship, which required Senate confirmation. Once the New York senators had resigned, and Robertson had been confirmed as Collector, Guiteau pressed his claim, and Blaine told him he would not receive the position.

Guiteau came to believe he had lost the position because he was a Stalwart. He decided the only way to end the Republican Party's internecine warfare was for Garfield to die—though he had nothing personal against the president. Arthur's succession would restore peace, he felt, and lead to rewards for fellow Stalwarts, including Guiteau.

The assassination of Abraham Lincoln was deemed a fluke due to the Civil War, and Garfield, like most people, saw no reason the president should be guarded; his movements and plans were often printed in the newspapers. Guiteau knew Garfield would leave Washington for a cooler climate on July 2, 1881, and made plans to kill him before then. He purchased a gun he thought would look good in a museum, and followed Garfield several times, but each time his plans were frustrated, or he lost his nerve. His opportunities dwindled to one—Garfield's departure by train for New Jersey on the morning of July 2.

Guiteau concealed himself by the ladies' waiting room at the Sixth Street Station of the Baltimore and Potomac Railroad, from where Garfield was scheduled to depart. Most of Garfield's cabinet planned to accompany him at least part of the way. Blaine, who was to remain in Washington, came to the station to see him off. The two men were deep in conversation and did not notice Guiteau as he took out his revolver and shot Garfield twice. Guiteau was quickly captured. As Blaine recognized him, Guiteau was led away, and said, "I did it. I will go to jail for it. I am a Stalwart and Arthur will be President." (Note: The words vary in some sources) News of his motivation to benefit the Stalwarts reached many with the news of the shooting, causing rage against that faction.

=== Treatment and death ===
One shot glanced off Garfield's arm while the other pierced his back, shattering a rib and embedding itself in his abdomen. "My God, what is this?" he exclaimed. He was tended to by Charles Burleigh Purvis, who became the first African-American physician to attend to a sitting president. Among those at the station was Robert Todd Lincoln, who was deeply upset, thinking back to when his father Abraham Lincoln had been assassinated 16 years earlier. Garfield was taken on a mattress upstairs to a private office, where several doctors examined him. At his request, Garfield was taken back to the White House, and his wife, then in New Jersey, was sent for. Blaine sent word to Vice President Arthur in New York City, who received threats against his life because of his animosity toward Garfield and Guiteau's statements.

Although Joseph Lister's pioneering work in antisepsis was known to American doctors, few of them had confidence in it, and none of his advocates was among Garfield's treating physicians. The physician who took charge at the depot and then at the White House was Doctor Willard Bliss. (Note: "Doctor" was his given name.) A noted physician and surgeon, Bliss was an old friend of Garfield, and about a dozen doctors, led by Bliss, were soon probing the wound with unsterilized fingers and instruments. Garfield was given morphine for the pain and asked Bliss to tell him frankly what his chances were, which Bliss put at one in a hundred. "Well, Doctor, we'll take that chance."

Over the next few days Garfield made some improvement, as the nation viewed the news from the capital and prayed. Although he never stood again, he was able to sit up and write several times, and his recovery was viewed so positively that a steamer was fitted out as a seagoing hospital to aid with his convalescence. He was nourished on oatmeal porridge (which he detested) and milk from a cow on the White House lawn. When told that Indian chief Sitting Bull, a prisoner of the army, was starving, Garfield said, "Let him starve..." initially, but a few moments later said, "No, send him my oatmeal."

X-ray imaging, which could have assisted physicians in precisely locating the bullet in Garfield's body, would not be invented for another 14 years. Alexander Graham Bell tried to locate the bullet with a primitive metal detector but was unsuccessful, though the device had been effective when tested on others. But Bliss limited its use on Garfield, ensuring he remained in charge. Because Bliss insisted the bullet rested someplace it did not, the detector could not locate it. Bell shortly returned after adjusting his device, which emitted an unusual tone in the area where Bliss believed the bullet was lodged. Bliss took this as confirmation that the bullet was where he declared it to be. Bliss recorded the test as a success, saying it was:

now unanimously agreed that the location of the ball has been ascertained with reasonable certainty, and that it lies, as heretofore stated, in the front wall of the abdomen, immediately over the groin, about five inches [130 mm] below and to the right of the navel.

One means of keeping Garfield comfortable in Washington's summer heat was one of the first successful air conditioning units: air propelled by fans over ice and then dried reduced the temperature in the sickroom by 20 °F (11 °C). Engineers from the navy and other scientists worked together to develop the unit, though there were problems to solve, such as excessive noise and increased humidity.

On July 23 Garfield took a turn for the worse when his temperature increased to 104 °F (40 °C); doctors, concerned by an abscess at the wound, inserted a drainage tube. This initially helped, and the bedridden Garfield held a brief cabinet meeting on July 29; members were under orders from Bliss to discuss nothing that might excite Garfield. Doctors probed the abscess, hoping to find the bullet; they likely made the infections worse. Garfield performed only one official act in August, signing an extradition paper. By the end of the month he was much feebler than he had been and his weight had decreased from 210 pounds (95 kg) to 130 pounds (59 kg).

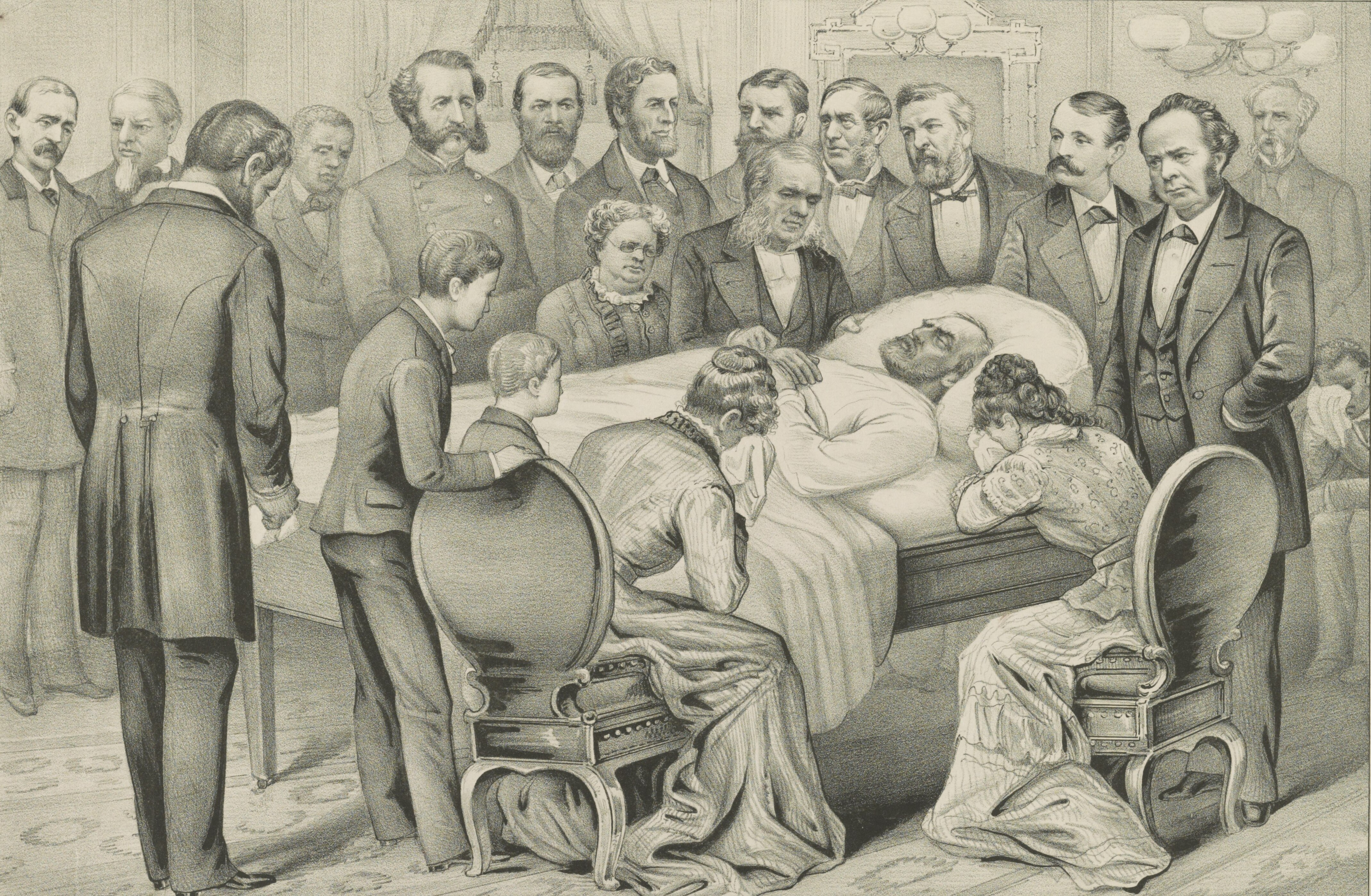
A depiction of Garfield on his deathbed

Garfield had long been anxious to escape hot, unhealthy Washington, and in early September the doctors agreed to move him to Elberon, part of Long Branch, New Jersey, where his wife had recovered earlier in the summer. He left the White House for the last time on September 5, traveling in a specially cushioned railway car; a spur line to the Francklyn Cottage, a seaside mansion given over to his use, was built in a night by volunteers. After arriving in Elberon the next day, Garfield was moved from the train car to a bedroom from which he could see the ocean as officials and reporters maintained what became (after an initial rally) a death watch. Garfield's personal secretary, Joe Stanley Brown, wrote forty years later, "to this day I cannot hear the sound of the low slow roll of the Atlantic on the shore, the sound which filled my ears as I walked from my cottage to his bedside, without recalling again that ghastly tragedy."

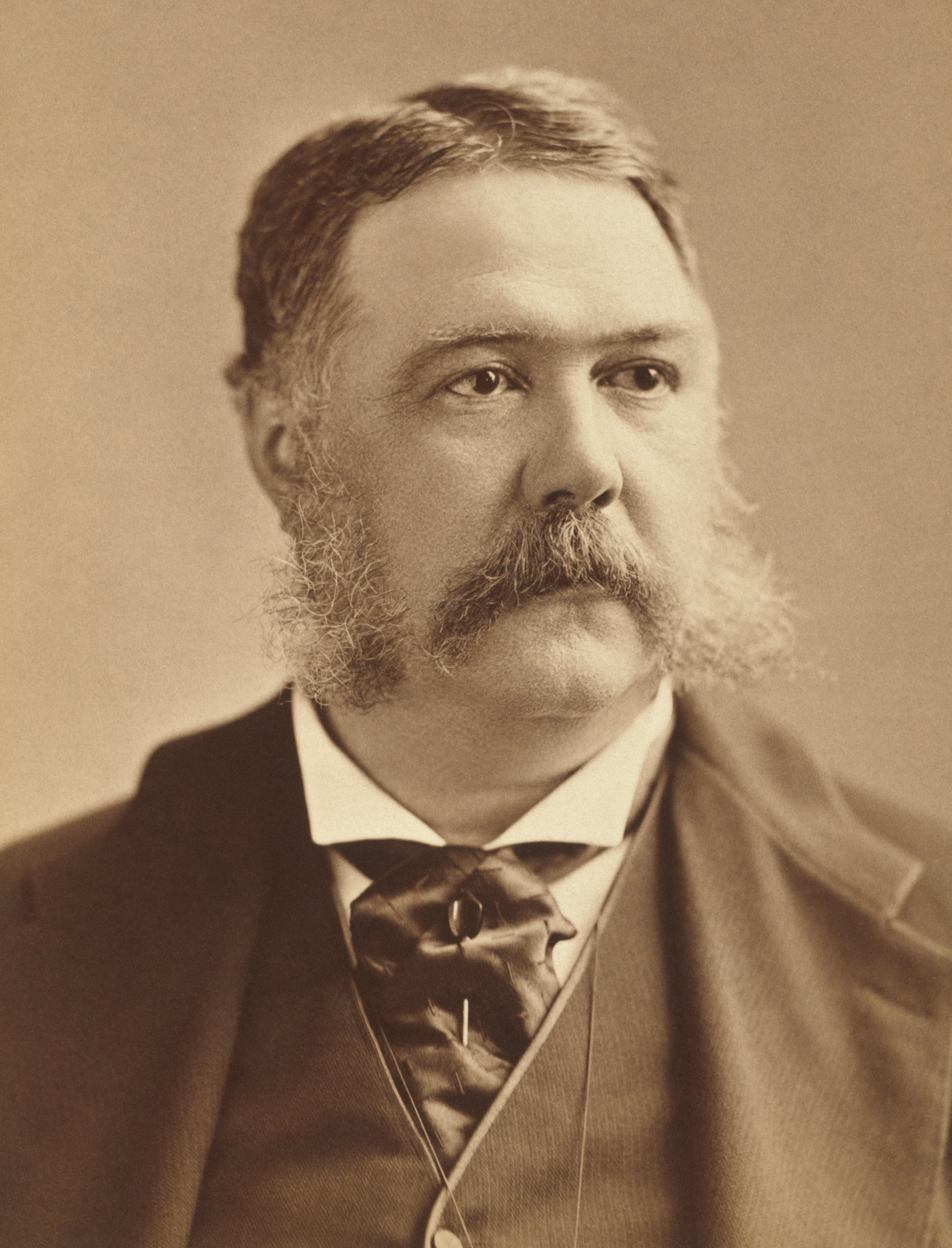
Vice President Chester A. Arthur assumed the presidency after Garfield's death.

On September 18, Garfield asked Colonel A. F. Rockwell, a friend, if he would have a place in history. Rockwell assured him he would and told Garfield he had much work still before him, but his response was, "No, my work is done." The next day, Garfield, suffering from pneumonia and hypertension, marveled that he could not pick up a glass despite feeling well, and went to sleep without discomfort. He awoke that evening around 10:15 p.m. complaining of great pain in his chest to his chief of staff General David G. Swaim, who was watching him, as he placed his hand over his heart. Garfield then requested a drink of water from Swaim. After finishing his glass, Garfield said, "Oh Swaim, this terrible pain—press your hand on it." As Swaim put his hand on Garfield's chest, Garfield's hands went up reflexively. Clutching his heart, he exclaimed, "Oh, Swaim, can't you stop this? Oh, oh, Swaim!" Those were Garfield's last words. Swaim ordered another attendant to send for Bliss, who found Garfield unconscious. Despite efforts to revive him, Garfield never awoke, and he was pronounced dead at about 10:30 p.m. Learning from a reporter of Garfield's death the following day, Chester Arthur took the presidential oath of office, administered by New York Supreme Court Justice John R. Brady.

According to some historians and medical experts, Garfield might have survived his wounds had the doctors attending him had at their disposal today's medical research, knowledge, techniques and equipment. Standard medical practice at the time dictated that priority be given to locating the path of the bullet. Several of his doctors inserted their unsterilized fingers into the wound to probe for the bullet, a common practice in the 1880s. Historians agree that massive infection was a significant factor in Garfield's demise. Biographer Peskin said medical malpractice did not contribute to Garfield's death; the inevitable infection and blood poisoning that would ensue from a deep bullet wound resulted in damage to multiple organs and spinal fragmentation. Rutkow, a professor of surgery at the University of Medicine and Dentistry of New Jersey, has argued that starvation also played a role, saying: "Garfield had such a nonlethal wound. In today's world, he would have gone home in a matter of two or three days." The conventional narrative of Garfield's post-shooting medical condition was challenged by Theodore Pappas and Shahrzad Joharifard in a 2013 article in The American Journal of Surgery. They argued that Garfield died of a pseudoaneurysm, a late rupture of a splenic artery, that developed secondary to the path of the bullet adjacent to the splenic artery. They also argued that his sepsis was actually caused by post-traumatic acute acalculous cholecystitis. Based on the autopsy report, the authors speculate that Garfield's gallbladder subsequently ruptured, leading to the development of a large bile-containing abscess adjacent to the gallbladder. Pappas and Joharifard said this caused the septic decline in Garfield's condition that was visible starting from July 23, 1881. Pappas and Joharifard also said they did not believe Garfield's doctors could have saved him even if they had been aware of his cholecystitis, since the first successful cholecystectomy (surgical removal of the gallbladder) was performed a year after Garfield's death.

Guiteau was indicted on October 14, 1881, for the murder of the president. During his trial, Guiteau declared that he was not responsible for Garfield's death, admitting to the shooting but not the killing. In his defense, Guiteau wrote: "General Garfield died from malpractice. According to his own physicians, he was not fatally shot. The doctors who mistreated him ought to bear the odium of his death, and not his assailant. They ought to be indicted for murdering James A. Garfield, and not me." After a chaotic trial in which Guiteau often interrupted and argued, and in which his counsel used the insanity defense, the jury found him guilty on January 25, 1882, and he was sentenced to death by hanging. Guiteau may have had neurosyphilis, a disease that causes physiological mental impairment. He was executed on June 30, 1882.

== Funeral, memorials and commemorations ==
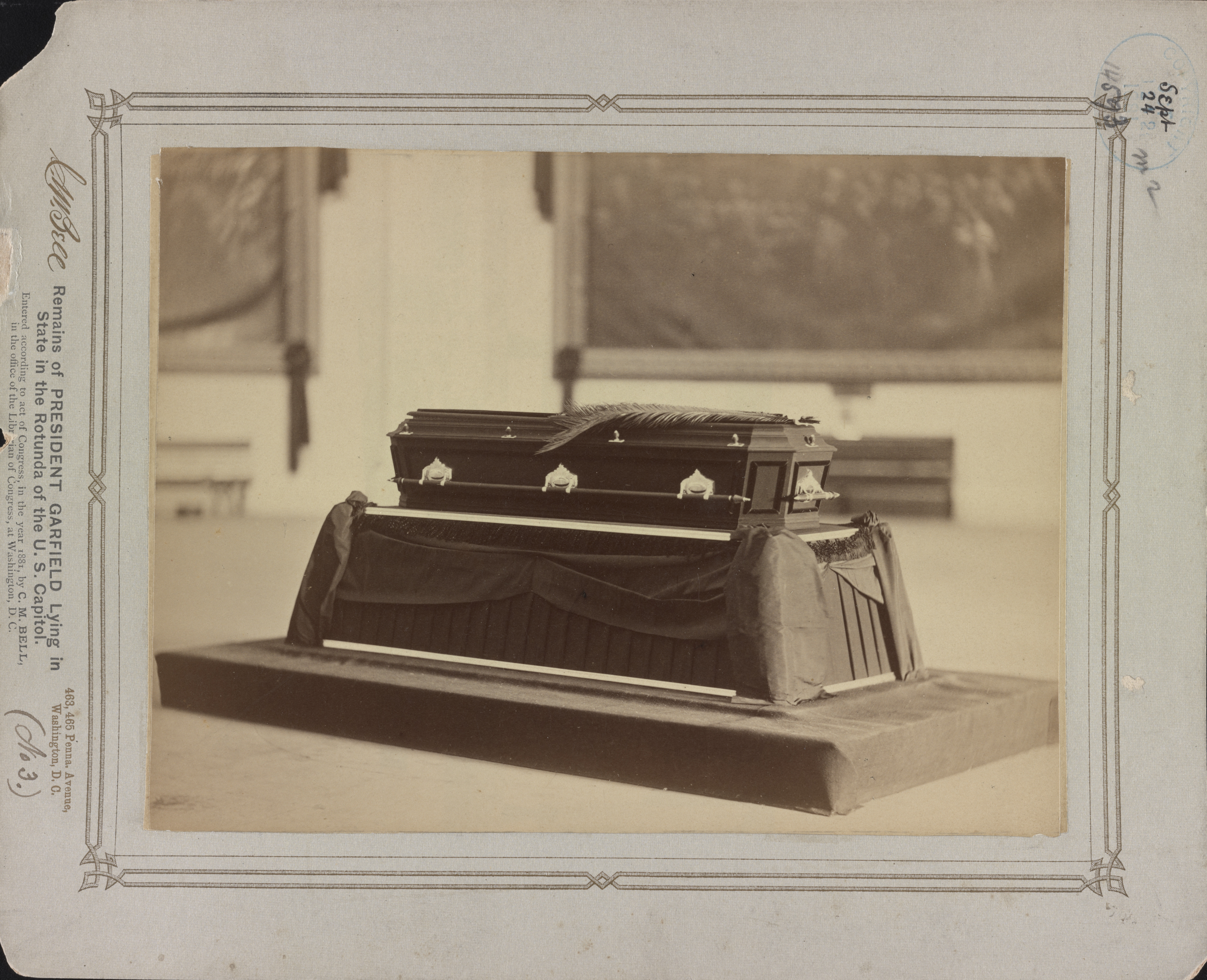
Garfield's casket lying in state at the Capitol Rotunda

Garfield's funeral train left Long Branch on the same special track that had brought him there, traveling over tracks blanketed with flowers and past houses adorned with flags. His body was transported to the Capitol and then continued on to Cleveland for burial. Shocked by his death, Marine Band leader John Philip Sousa composed the march "In Memoriam", which was played when Garfield's body was received in Washington, D.C. More than 70,000 citizens, some waiting over three hours, passed by Garfield's coffin as his body lay in state from September 21 to 23, 1881, at the United States Capitol rotunda; on September 25, in Cleveland, Garfield's casket was paraded down Euclid Avenue from Wilson Avenue to Public Square, with those in attendance including former presidents Grant and Hayes, and Generals William Sherman, Sheridan and Hancock. More than 150,000—a number equal to the city's population—likewise paid their respects, and Sousa's march was again played. Garfield's body was temporarily interred in the Schofield family vault in Cleveland's Lake View Cemetery until his permanent memorial was built.

Memorials to Garfield were erected across the country. On April 10, 1882, seven months after Garfield's death, the U.S. Post Office Department issued a postage stamp in his honor. In 1884, sculptor Frank Happersberger completed a monument on the grounds of the San Francisco Conservatory of Flowers. In 1887, the James A. Garfield Monument was dedicated in Washington. Another monument, in Philadelphia's Fairmount Park, was erected in 1896. In Victoria, Australia, Cannibal Creek was renamed Garfield in his honor.

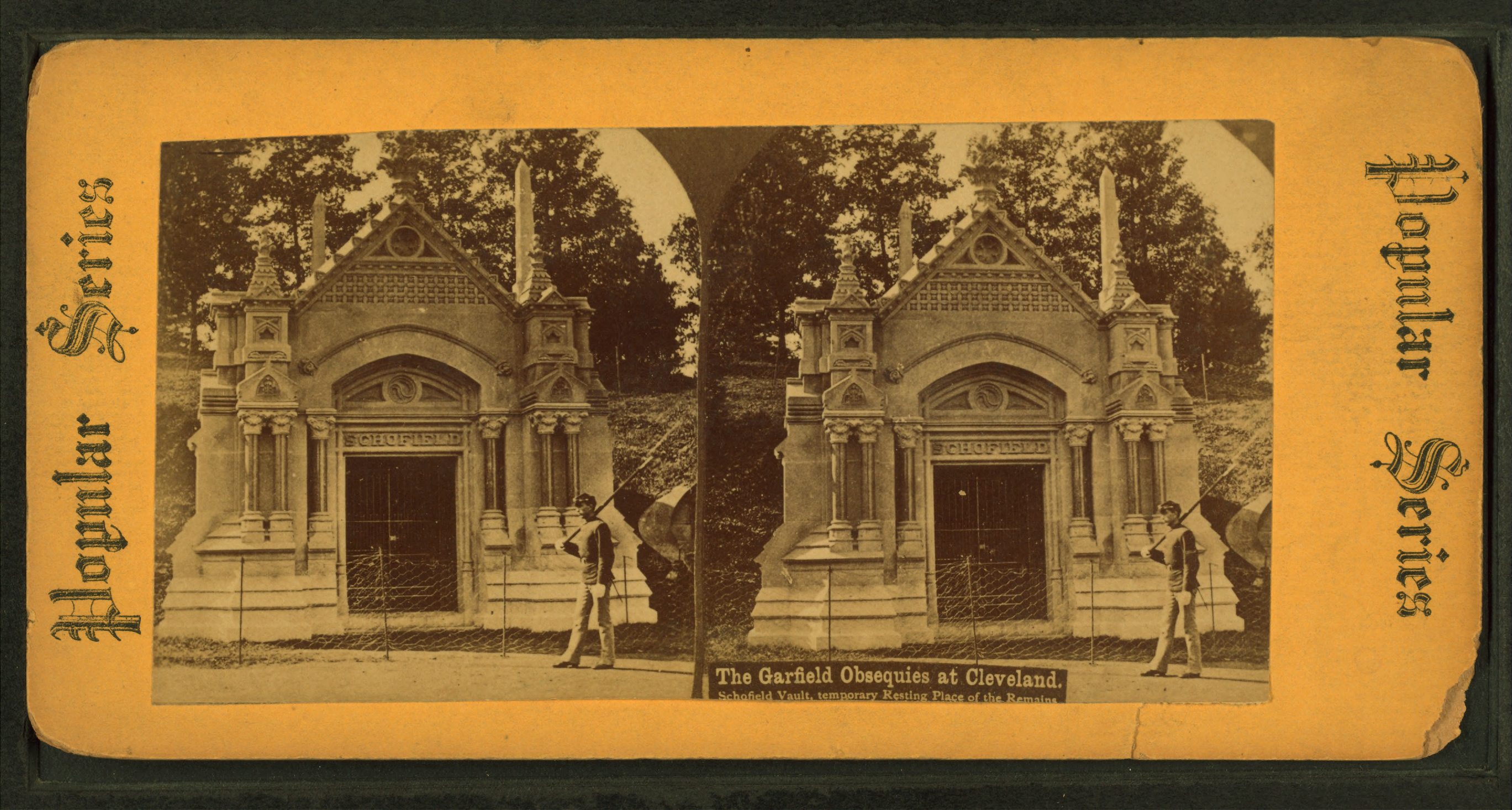
Stereoscopic images of the Schofield family vault where Garfield's remains were kept until completion of his permanent memorial

On May 19, 1890, Garfield's body was permanently interred, with great solemnity and fanfare, in a mausoleum in Lake View Cemetery. Attending the dedication ceremonies were former President Hayes, President Benjamin Harrison, and future president William McKinley. Treasury Secretary William Windom also attended. Harrison said Garfield was always a "student and instructor" and that his life works and death would "continue to be instructive and inspiring incidents in American history". Three panels on the monument display Garfield as a teacher, Union major general, and orator; another shows him taking the presidential oath, and a fifth shows his body lying in state at the Capitol rotunda in Washington, D.C.

Garfield's murder by a deranged office-seeker awakened public awareness of the need for civil service reform legislation. Senator George H. Pendleton, a Democrat from Ohio, launched a reform effort that resulted in the Pendleton Act in January 1883. This act reversed the "spoils system" where office seekers paid up or gave political service to obtain or keep federally appointed positions. Under the act, appointments were awarded on merit and competitive examination. To ensure the reform was implemented, Congress and Arthur established and funded the Civil Service Commission. The Pendleton Act, however, covered only 10% of federal government workers. For Arthur, previously known for having been a "veteran spoilsman", civil service reform became his most noteworthy achievement.

A marble statue of Garfield by Charles Niehaus was added to the National Statuary Hall Collection in the Capitol in Washington, D.C., a gift from the State of Ohio in 1886.

Garfield is honored with a life-size bronze sculpture inside the Cuyahoga County Soldiers' and Sailors' Monument in Cleveland, Ohio.

Many cities and towns in the U.S., Canada, and Australia are named for Garfield, as are several high schools.

On March 2, 2019, the National Park Service erected exhibit panels in Washington to mark the site of his assassination.

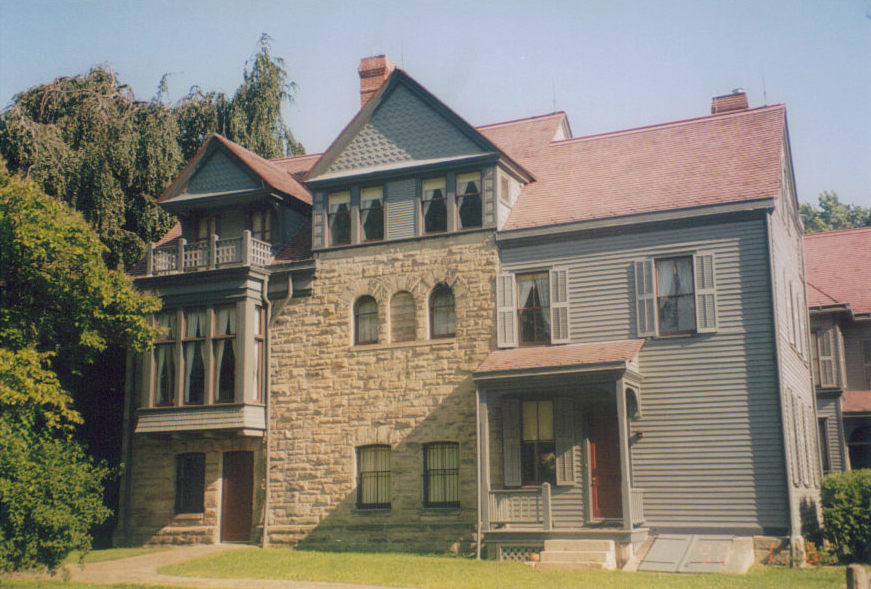
Lawnfield, Garfield National Historic Site, location of the "front porch campaign"

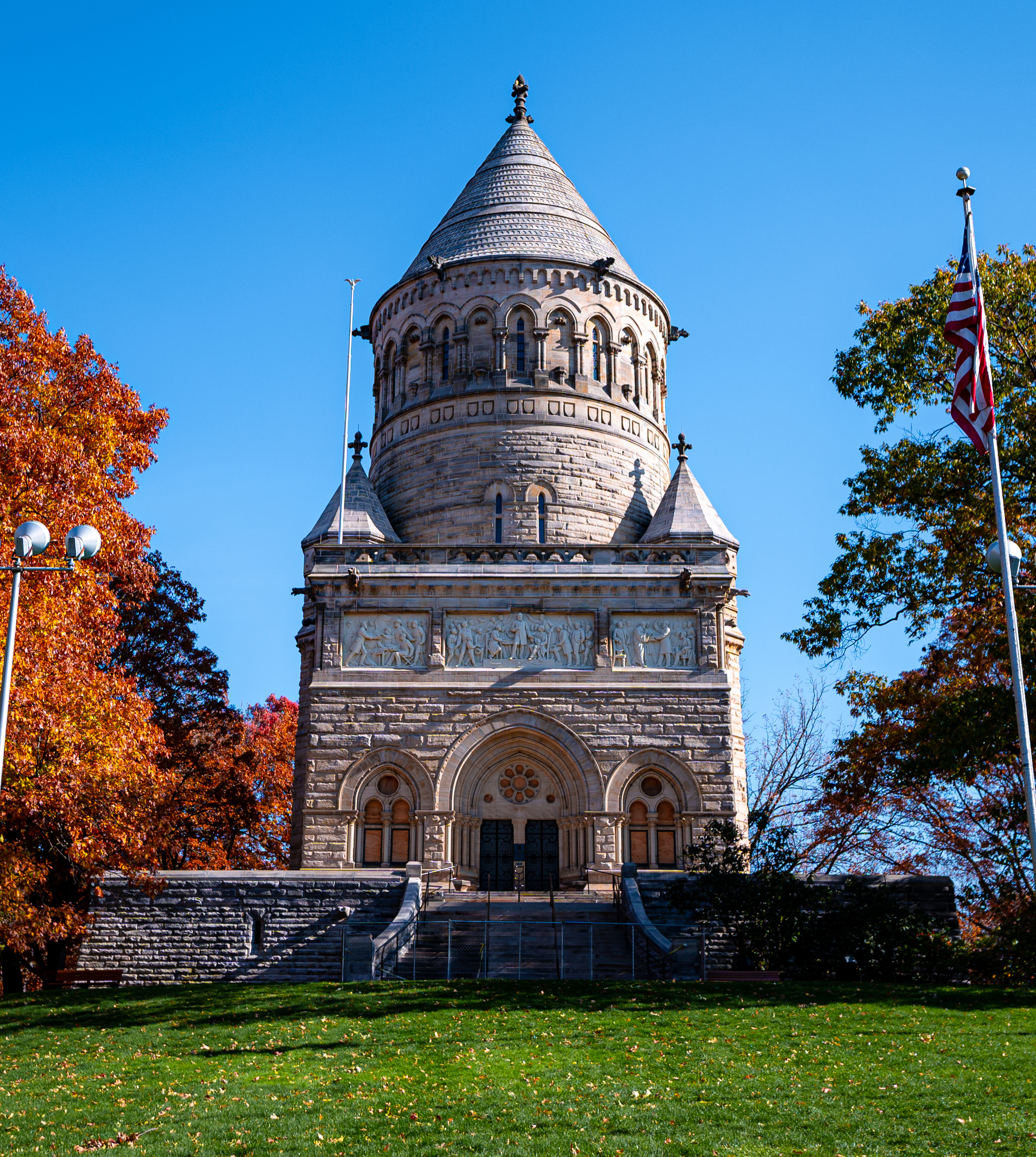
Garfield Memorial at Lake View Cemetery in Cleveland, Ohio

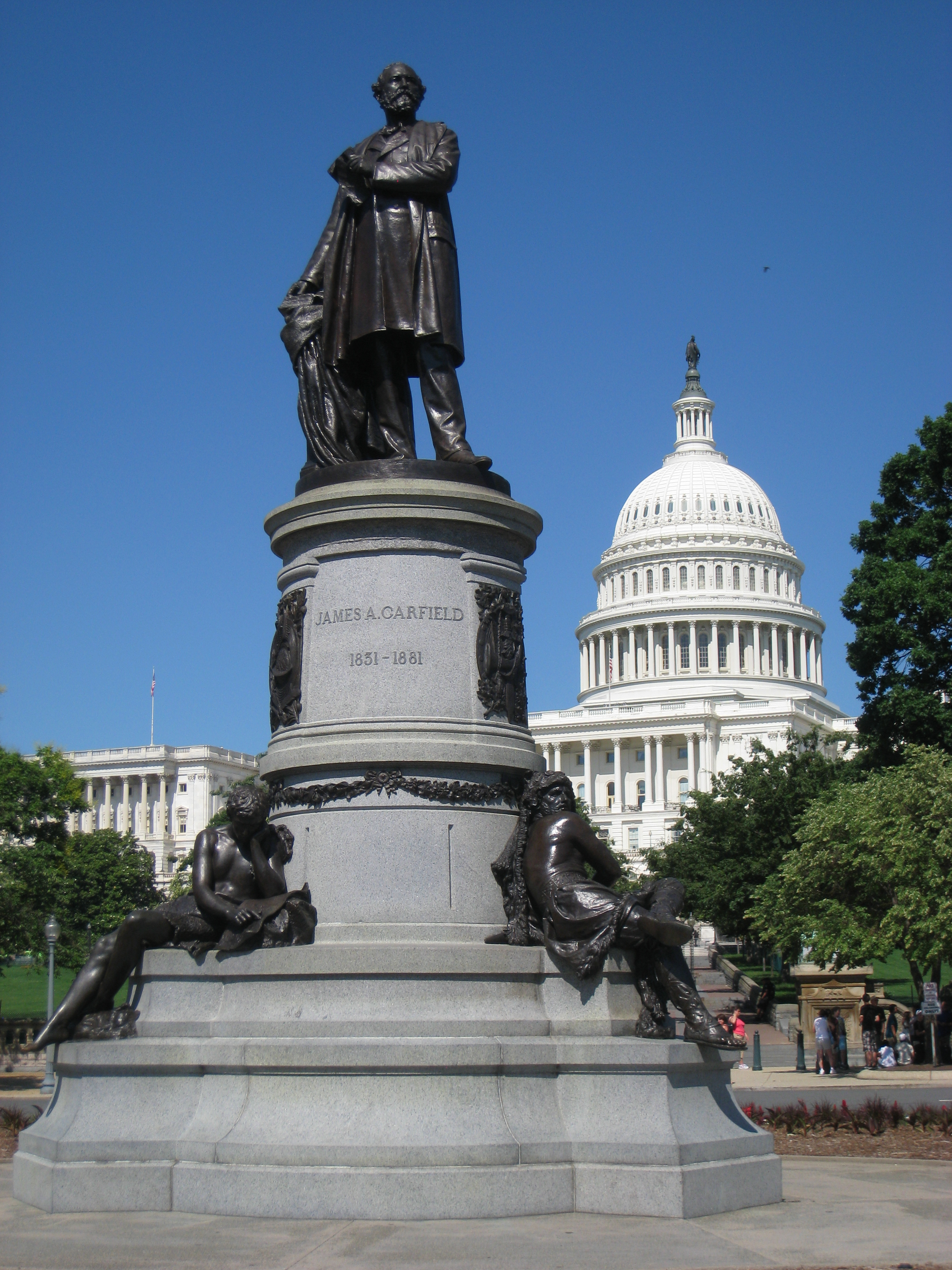
James A. Garfield Monument in Washington, D.C.

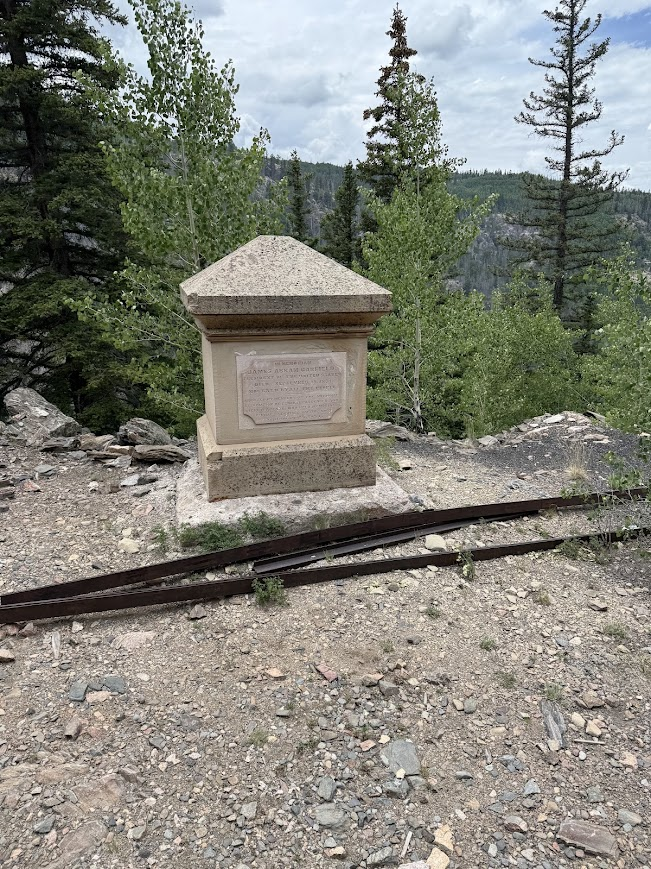
James A. Garfield Monument in Rio Arriba County, New Mexico.

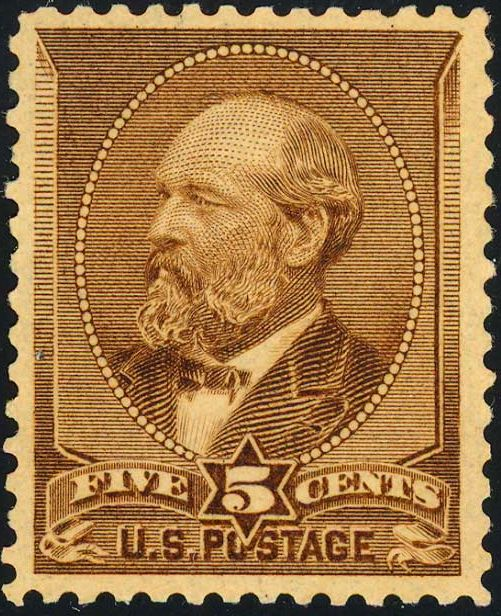
First Garfield postage stamp, 1882

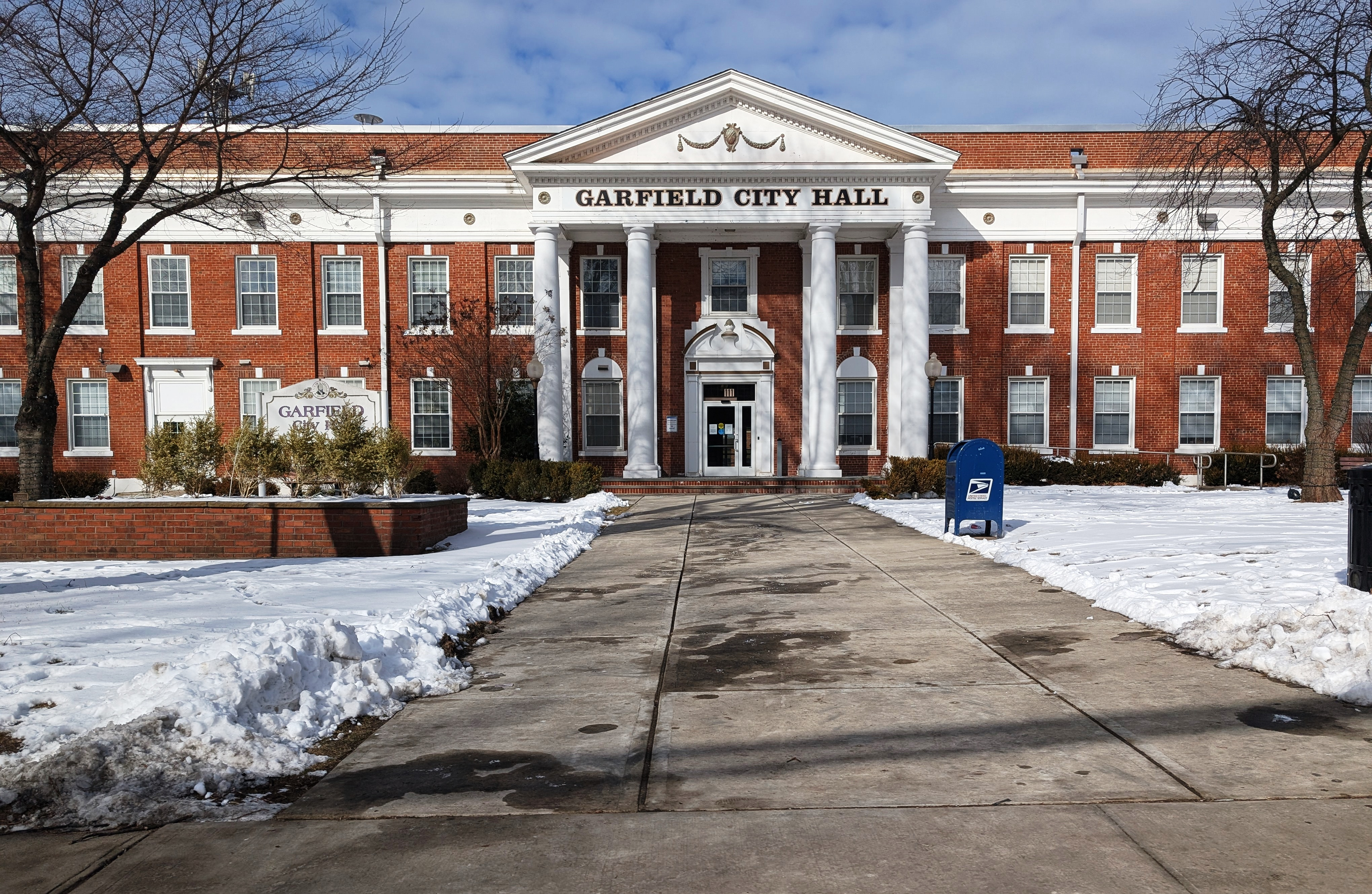
Garfield, New Jersey, one of many cities named for the president

== Legacy and historical view ==
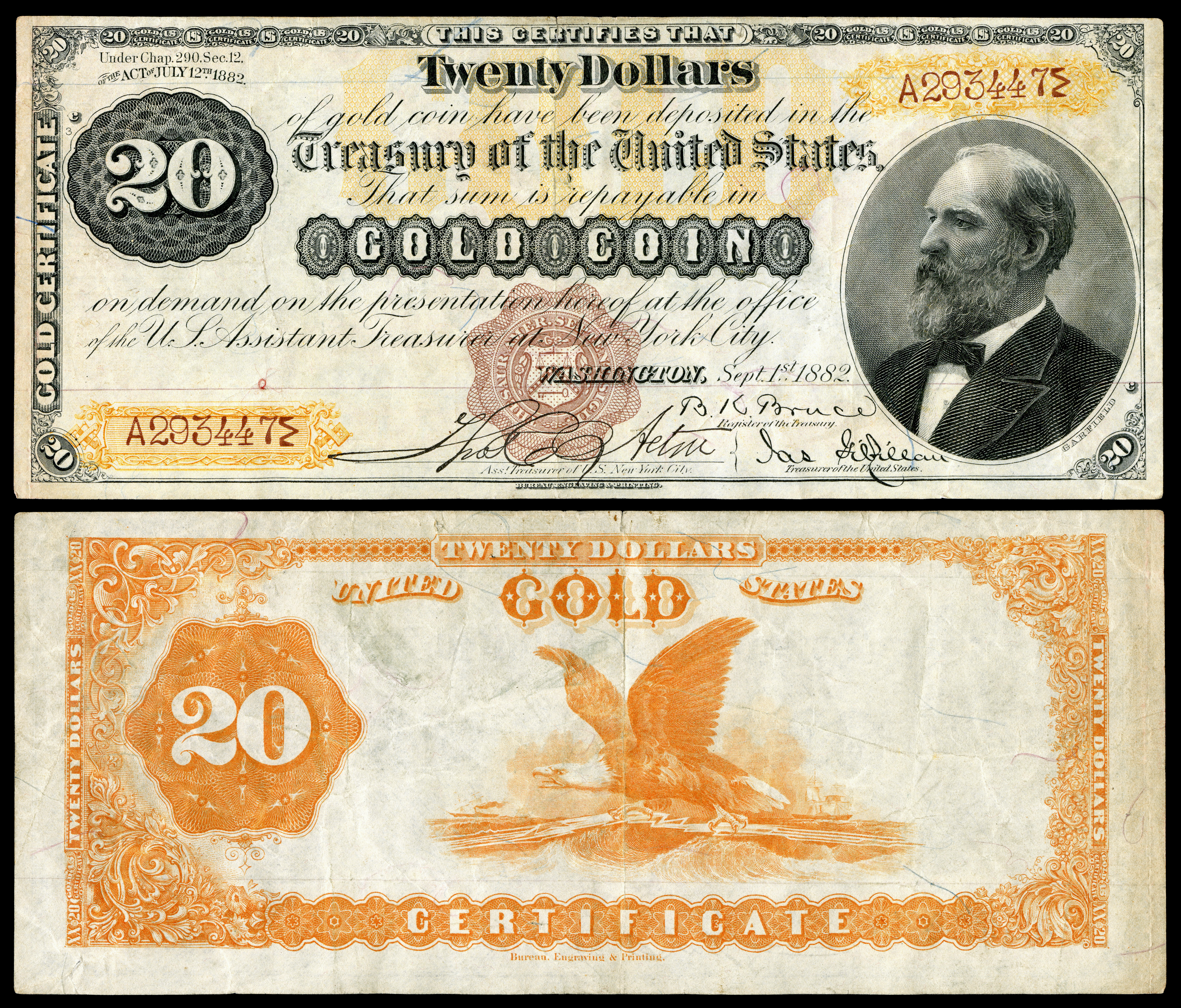
After his assassination Garfield was honored on the 1882 U.S. Large gold certificate

For a few years after his assassination, Garfield's life story was seen as an exemplar of the American success story—that even the poorest boy might someday become President of the United States. Peskin wrote: "In mourning Garfield, Americans were not only honoring a president; they were paying tribute to a man whose life story embodied their own most cherished aspirations." As the rivalry between Stalwarts and Half-Breeds faded from the scene in the late 1880s and after, so too did memories of Garfield. In the 1890s, Americans became disillusioned with politicians, and looked elsewhere for inspiration, focusing on industrialists, labor leaders, scientists, and others as their heroes. Increasingly, Garfield's short time as president was forgotten.

The 20th century saw no revival for Garfield. Thomas Wolfe deemed the presidents of the Gilded Age, including Garfield, "lost Americans" whose "gravely vacant and bewhiskered faces mixed, melted, swam together". The politicians of the Gilded Age faded from the public eye, their luster eclipsed by those who had influenced America outside of political office during that time; the robber barons, the inventors, those who had sought social reform, and others who had lived as America rapidly changed. Current events and more recent figures occupied America's attention. According to Ackerman, "the busy Twentieth Century has made Garfield's era seem remote and irrelevant, its leaders ridiculed for their very obscurity."

Garfield's biographers, and those who have studied his presidency, tend to think well of him, and that his presidency saw a promising start before its untimely end. Historian Justus D. Doenecke, while deeming Garfield something of an enigma, chronicles his achievements: "by winning a victory over the Stalwarts, he enhanced both the power and prestige of his office. As a man, he was intelligent, sensitive, and alert, and his knowledge of how government worked was unmatched." Doenecke criticizes Garfield's dismissal of Merritt in Robertson's favor, and wonders if the president was truly in command of the situation even after the latter's confirmation. In 1931, Caldwell wrote: "If Garfield lives in history, it will be partly on account of the charm of his personality—but also because in life and in death, he struck the first shrewd blows against a dangerous system of boss rule which seemed for a time about to engulf the politics of the nation. Perhaps if he had lived he could have done no more." Rutkow writes that "James Abram Garfield's presidency is reduced to a tantalizing 'what if.'"

External videos
- Booknotes interview with Kenneth Ackerman on Dark Horse: The Surprise Election and Political Murder of President James A. Garfield, July 27, 2003, C-SPAN

In 2002, historian Bernard A. Weisberger said Garfield "was, to some extent, a perfect moderate. He read widely (and unobtrusively) without its visibly affecting his Christianity, his Republicanism, or his general laissez-faire orthodoxy. He was not so much a scholar in politics as a politic scholar." Peskin believes Garfield deserves more credit for his political career than he has received: "True, his accomplishments were neither bold nor heroic, but his was not an age that called for heroism. His stormy presidency was brief, and in some respects, unfortunate, but he did leave the office stronger than he found it. As a public man he had a hand in almost every issue of national importance for almost two decades, while as a party leader he, along with Blaine, forged the Republican Party into the instrument that would lead the United States into the twentieth century."

Interest in Garfield was rekindled by the 2025 miniseries Death by Lightning. Other notable films and shows about Garfield include the 1939 film The Night Riders and the 2016 American Experience episode "Murder of a President".

== See also ==
- Disambiguation of places named "Garfield", many of which are named for the President
- List of presidents of the United States
- List of presidents of the United States by previous experience
- List of United States presidential assassination attempts and plots
- List of heads of state and government who were assassinated or executed
- Political violence in the United States

== Works cited ==
=== Books ===
- Ackerman, Kenneth D. (2003). Dark Horse: The Surprise Election and Political Murder of James A. Garfield. New York, New York: Avalon Publishing. ISBN 978-0-7867-1396-7.
- Bach, Penny Balkin (1992). Public Art in Philadelphia. Philadelphia, Pennsylvania: Temple University Press. ISBN 978-0-87722-822-6.
- Brown, Emma Elizabeth (1881). The Life and Public Services of James A. Garfield / Twentieth President of the United States. Boston, Massachusetts: D. Lothrop Company. OCLC 3037198.
- Caldwell, Robert Granville (1965) [1931]. James A. Garfield: Party Chieftain. New York, New York: Dodd, Mead & Co. OCLC 833793627.
- Calhoun, Charles W. (2017). The Presidency of Ulysses S. Grant. Lawrence: University Press of Kansas. ISBN 978-0-7006-2484-3. scholarly review and response by Calhoun at doi:10.14296/RiH/2014/2270
- Clancy, Herbert J. (1958). The Presidential Election of 1880. Chicago, Illinois: Loyola University Press. (2011 Literary Licensing edition ISBN 978-1-258-19190-0.)
- Crapol, Edward P. (2000). James G. Blaine: Architect of Empire. Biographies in American Foreign Policy. Vol. 4. Wilmington, Delaware: Scholarly Resources. ISBN 978-0-8420-2604-8.
- Doenecke, Justus D. (1981). The Presidencies of James A. Garfield & Chester A. Arthur. Lawrence, Kansas: The Regents Press of Kansas. ISBN 978-0-7006-0208-7.
- Foner, Eric (2014). Reconstruction: America's Unfinished Revolution 1863–1877 Updated Version. New York: Harper Perennial. ISBN 978-0-06-235451-8.
- Garfield National Memorial Association (1890). The Man and the Mausoleum. Cleveland, Ohio: Cleveland Print and Publishing Company. OCLC 1656783.
- Howe, George F. (1966) [1935]. Chester A. Arthur, A Quarter-Century of Machine Politics. New York: F. Ungar Pub. Co. ISBN 978-1499999402.
- Millard, Candice, Destiny of the Republic, A Tale of Madness, Medicine, and the Murder of a President, 2012 Knopf Doubleday
- McAlister, Lester G.; Tucker, William E. (1975). Journey in Faith: A History of the Christian Church (Disciples of Christ). St. Louis, Missouri: Chalice Press. ISBN 978-0-8272-1703-4.
- McFeely, William S. (1981). Grant: A Biography. New York, New York: W. W. Norton & Company, Inc. ISBN 978-0-393-32394-8.
- Peskin, Allan (1978). Garfield: A Biography. Kent, Ohio: Kent State University Press. ISBN 978-0-87338-210-6.
- Pletcher, David M. The Awkward Years: American Foreign Relations under Garfield and Arthur (U of Missouri Press, 1962). online
- Radford, Warren; Radford, Georgia (2002). Outdoor Sculpture in San Francisco: a Heritage of Public Art. Gualala, California: Helsham Press. ISBN 978-0-9717607-1-4.
- Rutkow, Ira (2006). James A. Garfield. New York, New York: Macmillan Publishers. ISBN 978-0-8050-6950-1. OCLC 255885600.
- Smith, Jean Edward (2001). Grant. New York, New York: Simon & Schuster Paperback. ISBN 978-0-684-84927-0.
- Weisberger, Bernard A. (2002). Henry F. Graff (ed.). The Presidents A Reference History James A. Garfield and Chester A. Arthur. Charles Scribners's Sons.

=== Periodicals ===
- Schaffer, Amanda (July 25, 2006). "A President Felled by an Assassin and 1880s Medical Care". The New York Times. New York, New York. Archived from the original on March 1, 2019.
- The Magazine of American History (digital). Vol. 25. The University of California: A.S. Barnes & Company. 1891.

=== Online ===
- Peskin, Allan (February 2000). "Garfield, James Abram". American National Biography Online. Archived from the original on February 5, 2017.(subscription required)
- "5 cent Garfield". Smithsonian National Postal Museum. May 16, 2006. Archived from the original on September 7, 2014.
- "Garfield, James Abram 1831–1881". history.house.gov. History, Arts, & Archives United States House of Representatives.

Ohio Senate
Preceded by George P. Ashmun	Member of the Ohio Senate from the 26th district 1860–1861	Succeeded by Lucius V. Bierce
U.S. House of Representatives
Preceded by Albert G. Riddle	Member of the U.S. House of Representatives from Ohio's 19th congressional district 1863–1881	Succeeded by Ezra B. Taylor
Preceded by Robert C. Schenck	Chair of the House Military Affairs Committee; 1867–1869	Succeeded by John A. Logan
Preceded by Theodore M. Pomeroy	Chair of the House Financial Services Committee; 1869–1871	Succeeded by Samuel Hooper
Preceded by Henry L. Dawes	Chair of the House Appropriations Committee; 1871–1875	Succeeded by Samuel J. Randall
Party political offices
Preceded by Rutherford B. Hayes	Republican nominee for President of the United States; 1880	Succeeded by James G. Blaine
Political offices
Preceded by Rutherford Hayes	President of the United States; 1881	Succeeded by Chester A. Arthur
Honorary titles
Preceded by Henry Wilson	Persons who have lain in state or honor in the United States Capitol rotunda 1881	Succeeded by John A. Logan
