= Margaret Stanley-Brown =

American surgeon

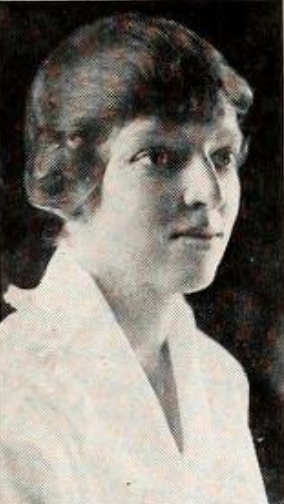
- Margaret Stanley-Brown, from the 1919 yearbook of Vassar College
- Born: October 2, 1895; Washington, D.C., U.S.
- Died: June 12, 1958 (age 62); New Milford, Connecticut, U.S.
- Occupations: Surgeon, medical school professor
- Relatives: James A. Garfield (grandfather); Herbert Feis (brother-in-law)

Margaret Stanley-Brown Sellers (October 2, 1895 – June 12, 1958) was an American surgeon and medical school professor, based in New York City. She was the granddaughter of President James A. Garfield.

== Early life and education ==
Stanley-Brown was born in Washington, D.C., the youngest child of Joseph Stanley-Brown and Mary (Mollie) Garfield Stanley-Brown. Her mother was the only daughter of President James A. Garfield. Her father was President Garfield's private secretary; he also worked with John Wesley Powell. Her brother Rudolph Stanley-Brown was a noted architect and writer. Her sister Ruth, also a writer, married historian Herbert Feis.

Stanley-Brown attended the Hartridge School in New Jersey, and graduated from Vassar College in 1919. She graduated from the Columbia University College of Physicians and Surgeons in 1923.

== Career ==
Stanley-Brown served her residency and internship at Bellevue Hospital. She was on the surgical staff of Fifth Avenue Hospital and assistant director of surgery at City Hospital. She taught at the Columbia University medical school. She moved to Connecticut in 1953, and was a surgeon on staff at New Milford Hospital.

She was a member of the New York Surgical Society and a fellow of the American College of Surgeons.

== Publications ==
Stanley-Brown was co-author on several research papers, published in scholarly journals including Archives of Pediatric and Adolescent Medicine, Experimental Biology and Medicine, The American Journal of Surgery, Thrombosis and Haemostasis, Annals of Surgery, American Journal of Obstetrics and Gynecology, and Journal of Biological Chemistry.

- "Evaluation of blood clotting factors in surgical diseases" (1929, with Frederic W. Bancroft and I. Newton Kugelmass)
- "The determination and regulation of blood clotting function in childhood" (1930, with Frederic W. Bancroft and I. Newton Kugelmass)
- "Relationship between complement and prothrombin" (1934, with Frederic W. Bancroft and Armand J. Quick)
- "Postoperative thrombosis and embolism" (1935, with Frederic W. Bancroft and Armand J. Quick)
- "A study of the coagulation defect in hemophilia and in jaundice" (1935, with Frederic W. Bancroft and Armand J. Quick)
- "Studies on the chemistry of blood coagulation" (1936, with Erwin Chargaff and Frederic W. Bancroft)
- "Modified Kondoleon operation for sclerosed leg with ulceration" (1940, with Frederic W. Banroft and R. F. Taylor)
- "Supracervical pregnancy following supravaginal hysterectomy" (1944, with Frances E. Shields)

== Personal life ==
Stanley-Brown married widowed writer Max K. Sellers in 1950. She died in 1958, at the age of 64, at a hospital in New Milford, Connecticut.
