= Harry Augustus Garfield =

American lawyer, academic and public official (1863–1942)

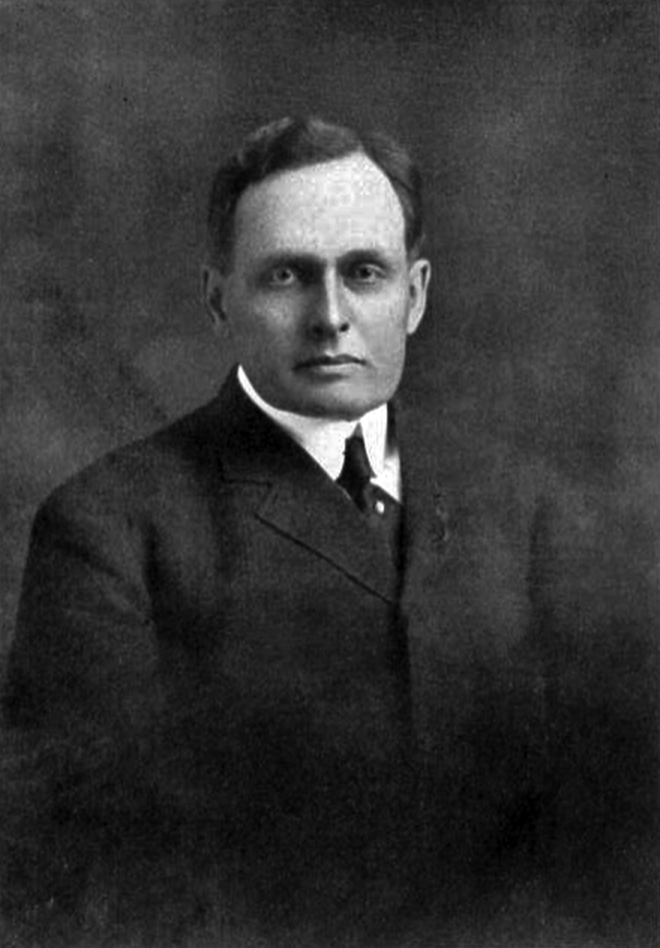
- Garfield, c. 1911

8th President of Williams College
- In office 1908–1934

Supervisor of the United States Fuel Administration
- In office 1917–1919
- Preceded by: Office established
- Succeeded by: Office abolished

Personal details
- Born: October 11, 1863 Hiram, Ohio, U.S.
- Died: December 12, 1942 (aged 79) Williamstown, Massachusetts, U.S.
- Resting place: Williams College Cemetery; Williamstown, Massachusetts, U.S.
- Spouse: Belle Hartford Mason (m. 1888)
- Relations: James Rudolph Garfield (brother); Abram Garfield (brother) Mollie Garfield (sister)
- Children: 4
- Parents: James A. Garfield (father); Lucretia Garfield (mother)
- Education: Columbia Law School
- Alma mater: Williams College (BA)
- Awards: Distinguished Service Medal

Harry Augustus "Hal" Garfield (October 11, 1863 – December 12, 1942) was an American lawyer, academic, and public official. He was president of Williams College and supervised the United States Fuel Administration during World War I. He was a son of President James A. Garfield.

== Early life ==
Harry Augustus Garfield was born on October 11, 1863, in Hiram, Ohio, to future President (then General in the Union Army) James A. Garfield and First Lady Lucretia Garfield. His mother named him in May 1864 after two of James Garfield's friends. His father called him "little Chickamauga" because he was born shortly after the Battle of Chickamauga. He went by the nickname of "Hal".

Garfield attended public school, a private academy and was tutored at home. In 1876 the family moved to what is now the James A. Garfield National Historic Site in Mentor, Ohio, and in 1879 he was sent to St. Paul's School in Concord, New Hampshire. At the beginning of his final year at St. Paul's he moved to Washington, D.C. to be taught by a private tutor at the White House.

At the age of 17 he and his 15-year-old brother James Rudolph Garfield watched in horror as their father was shot by Charles Guiteau. The president died from infections related to his wounds after two months.

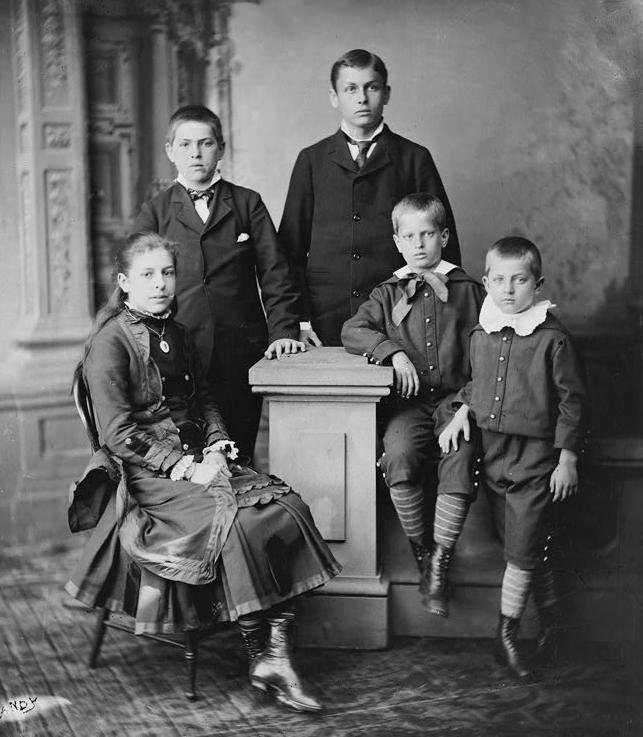
Harry A. Garfield (third from the left) and siblings.

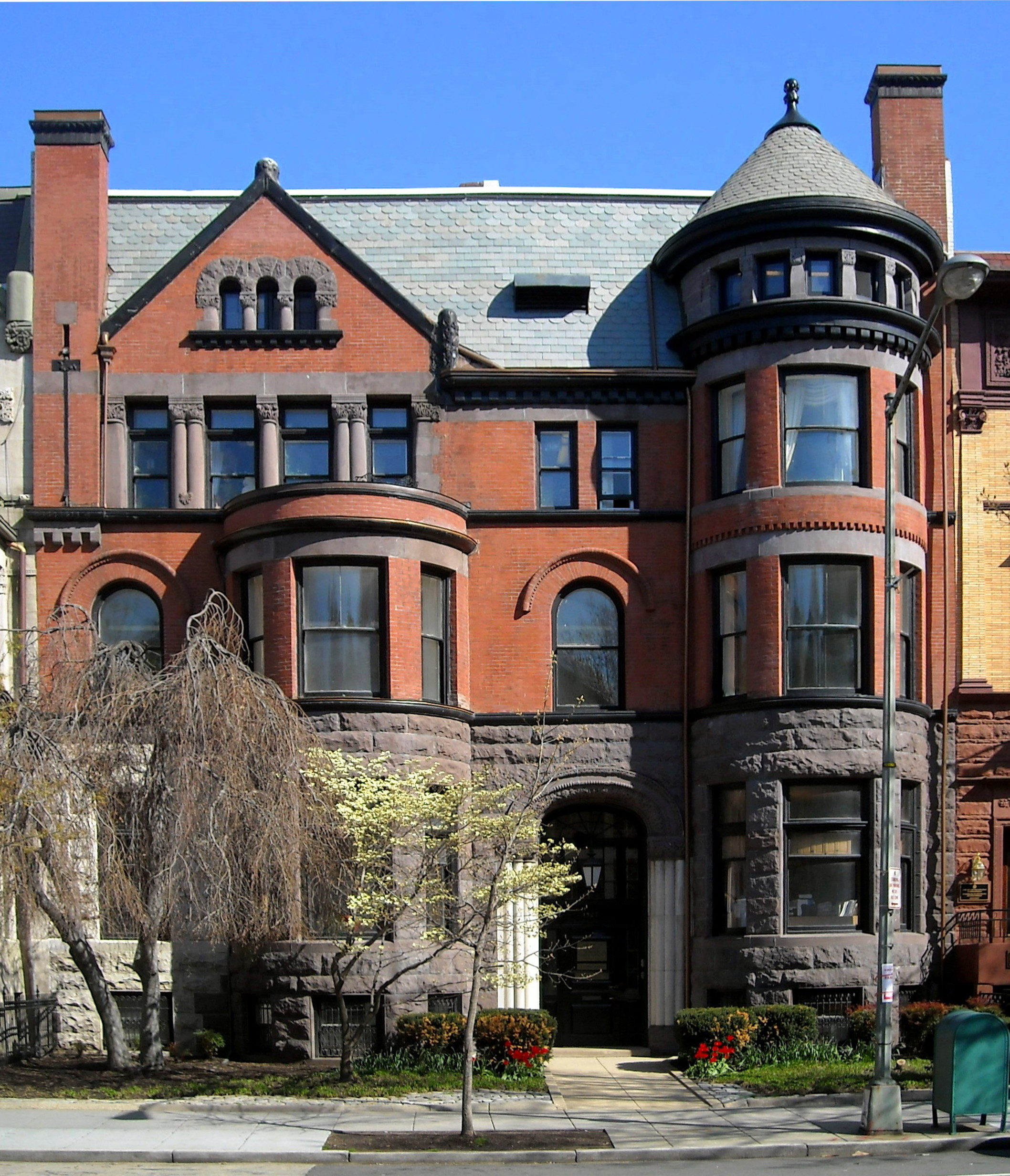
Former residence of Garfield in Dupont Circle, Washington, D.C.

Garfield graduated from Williams College in 1885 with a Bachelor of Arts degree. At Williams, he was a member of Alpha Delta Phi. He went on to study law at Columbia Law School, spending his second year reading law at All Souls College in Oxford and the Inns Court in London.

== Career ==
Garfield taught Roman history and Latin for a year at St. Paul's School after graduating Williams. From 1888 to 1895, he practiced law with his brother James in Cleveland with the firm Garfield, Garfield & Howe. He was professor of contracts at Western Reserve Law School from 1891 to 1897. In 1893, Garfield became a charter member of the Cleveland Chamber of Commerce and in 1896 helped to organize and served as first president of the Cleveland Municipal Association. He also served as president of the Chamber of Commerce from 1898 to 1899. From 1900 to 1906, Garfield managed a syndicate for railroad companies in Ohio. He was professor of politics at Princeton University from 1903 to 1908. While at Princeton, he befriended future president Woodrow Wilson. In 1908, Garfield became a law professor and eighth president of his alma mater, Williams College in Massachusetts.

=== World War I ===
Herbert Hoover, then head of the U.S. Food Administration, called Garfield to become chairman of the price-fixing committee of the Food Administration. He also served on the price-fixing committee of the War Industries Board.

In August 1917, President Woodrow Wilson asked him to run the nation's United States Fuel Administration during World War I, and he took a leave of absence from his duties as president of Williams. Garfield's duty was to conserve the coal supply and keep the price within reasonable bounds. Local committees were appointed throughout the country to study local conditions and their reports formed the basis for the prices fixed in different localities. The ensuing winter was unusually severe, and serious shortage of coal threatened. Because of the shortage of coal in the northeastern United States, especially in New York City and Ohio, Garfield's administration of the office was severely criticized in the press, but an investigation by the United States Congress showed that the shortage was due to failure of the railroads to meet the extra demands upon them, and federal control of the roads was instituted on December 28, 1917.

Garfield also issued his "idle Mondays" order in January 1918, which closed non-essential industries for five consecutive days beginning January 18 and on every Monday thereafter up to March 25. This roused a storm of protest from many manufacturers, and the U.S. Senate voted a resolution, requesting postponement, but this reached him after the order had been signed. On February 14, however, the order was suspended and priority for certain shipments substituted. He disapproved of the method of settling the coal strike in December 1919 and resigned his office, resuming that of president of Williams College.

=== Later career ===
After the war, Garfield returned to serve as president of Williams College. During his tenure, he helped establish the Institute of Politics at Williams. He served as president until his retirement in June 1934.

He was president of the American Political Science Association from 1921 to 1922.

In 1935, he studied international problems while living in Washington, D.C. In 1941, he accepted an appointment to the War Department Defense Board, a board focused on studying applications of the Excess Profits Law during World War II.

== Personal life ==
Garfield married his second cousin, Belle Hartford Mason, on June 14, 1888. They had a double wedding with Garfield's sister Mollie and Joseph Stanley Brown. Garfield and his wife had four children: James, Mason, Lucretia and Stanton. After his retirement in 1934, he took a one-year trip around the world with his wife. After his return in 1935, he moved to Washington, D.C.

He was a hereditary companion of the Ohio Commandery of the Military Order of the Loyal Legion of the United States by right of his father's service as a major general in Union Army during the American Civil War.

== Death ==
Garfield died on December 12, 1942, at his home in Williamstown, Massachusetts. He was buried in the faculty cemetery at Williams College.

== Awards ==
For his service as Fuel Administrator, Garfield was awarded the Distinguished Service Medal in 1921 by the Secretary of War Newton D. Baker.

Garfield was a recipient of honorary degrees from Dartmouth College, Princeton University, Amherst College, Wesleyan University, the College of William and Mary and Whitman College.

== See also: ==
- List of children of presidents of the United States

== Works ==
- America's coal problem in 1918. Washington, Govt. Print. Off., 1918. OCLC 34188455
- The fuel situation at the beginning of winter 1918–19, Washington, Govt. Print. Off., 1918. OCLC 44062275
- Recent political developments, progress or change? 1924. OCLC 77660203
- Lost visions, Boston: Priv. Print. by Thomas Todd Co. 1944. OCLC 3615228
