= Hiram, Ohio =

- Village
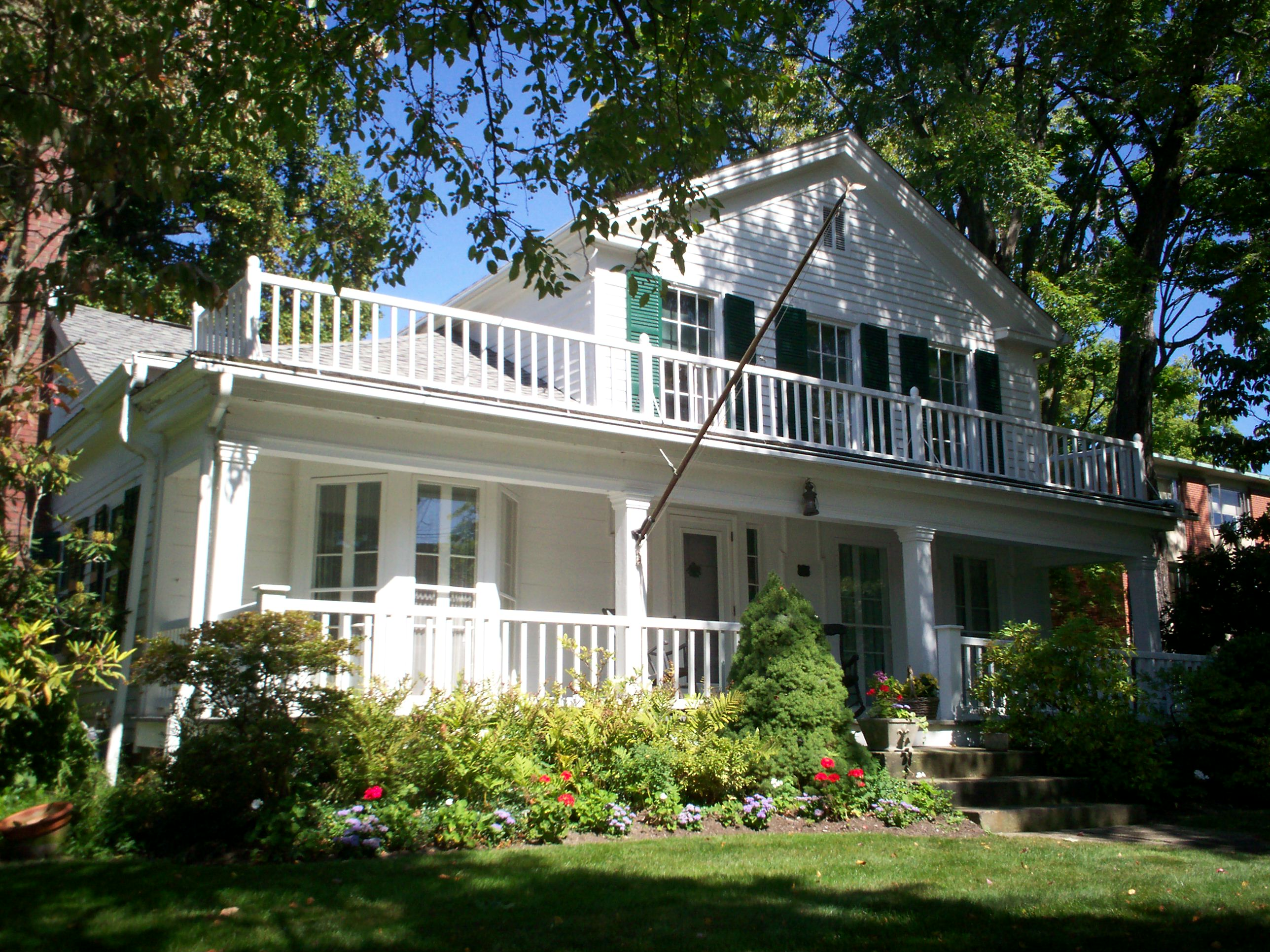
- Home of U.S. President James A. Garfield from 1863 to 1876
- Interactive map of Hiram, Ohio
- Location within Ohio Location within the United States
- Coordinates: 41°18′41″N 81°08′34″W
- Country: United States
- State: Ohio
- County: Portage

Area
  - Total: 1.10 sq mi (2.84 km^{2})
  - Land: 1.10 sq mi (2.84 km^{2})
  - Water: 0 sq mi (0.00 km^{2})
- Elevation: 1,260 ft (380 m)

Population (2020)
  - Total: 996
  - Estimate (2023): 945
  - Density: 908.8/sq mi (350.89/km^{2})
- Time zone: UTC-5 (Eastern (EST))
  - Summer (DST): UTC-4 (EDT)
- ZIP code: 44234
- Area codes: 330, 234
- FIPS code: 39-35658
- GNIS feature ID: 2398515
- Website: hiramohio.org

Hiram is a village in northern Portage County, Ohio, United States. It was formed from portions of Hiram Township in the Connecticut Western Reserve. The population was 996 at the 2020 census. Hiram is part of the Akron metropolitan area. It is the home of Hiram College, a small, private liberal arts college. The Hiram post office was established in 1816.

== Geography ==
According to the United States Census Bureau, the village has a total area of 1.10 square miles (2.85 km^{2}), all land.

=== Climate ===
Climate data for Hiram, Ohio, 1991–2020 normals, extremes 1893–present
Month	Jan	Feb	Mar	Apr	May	Jun	Jul	Aug	Sep	Oct	Nov	Dec	Year
Record high °F (°C)	71 (22)	73 (23)	81 (27)	87 (31)	93 (34)	100 (38)	101 (38)	102 (39)	102 (39)	88 (31)	80 (27)	73 (23)	102 (39)
Mean maximum °F (°C)	56.5 (13.6)	58.5 (14.7)	68.4 (20.2)	78.9 (26.1)	84.3 (29.1)	88.6 (31.4)	89.9 (32.2)	88.5 (31.4)	86.2 (30.1)	77.8 (25.4)	67.4 (19.7)	58.4 (14.7)	91.0 (32.8)
Mean daily maximum °F (°C)	32.5 (0.3)	35.2 (1.8)	44.4 (6.9)	58.0 (14.4)	68.9 (20.5)	77.0 (25.0)	80.9 (27.2)	79.5 (26.4)	73.2 (22.9)	60.9 (16.1)	48.3 (9.1)	37.2 (2.9)	58.0 (14.5)
Daily mean °F (°C)	24.2 (−4.3)	26.0 (−3.3)	34.4 (1.3)	46.8 (8.2)	57.8 (14.3)	66.4 (19.1)	70.4 (21.3)	68.9 (20.5)	62.4 (16.9)	50.7 (10.4)	39.6 (4.2)	29.9 (−1.2)	48.1 (9.0)
Mean daily minimum °F (°C)	15.9 (−8.9)	16.7 (−8.5)	24.5 (−4.2)	35.7 (2.1)	46.8 (8.2)	55.8 (13.2)	59.9 (15.5)	58.3 (14.6)	51.6 (10.9)	40.6 (4.8)	30.9 (−0.6)	22.6 (−5.2)	38.3 (3.5)
Mean minimum °F (°C)	−4.1 (−20.1)	−1.6 (−18.7)	6.5 (−14.2)	22.3 (−5.4)	33.1 (0.6)	42.9 (6.1)	49.8 (9.9)	48.3 (9.1)	39.8 (4.3)	29.3 (−1.5)	17.5 (−8.1)	5.7 (−14.6)	−7.1 (−21.7)
Record low °F (°C)	−25 (−32)	−24 (−31)	−11 (−24)	2 (−17)	24 (−4)	33 (1)	40 (4)	38 (3)	27 (−3)	20 (−7)	−2 (−19)	−14 (−26)	−25 (−32)
Average precipitation inches (mm)	3.34 (85)	2.70 (69)	3.42 (87)	4.01 (102)	4.06 (103)	4.19 (106)	4.31 (109)	3.70 (94)	4.04 (103)	3.77 (96)	3.17 (81)	3.39 (86)	44.10 (1,120)
Average snowfall inches (cm)	20.4 (52)	12.5 (32)	9.9 (25)	0.7 (1.8)	0.0 (0.0)	0.0 (0.0)	0.0 (0.0)	0.0 (0.0)	0.0 (0.0)	0.3 (0.76)	5.3 (13)	13.8 (35)	62.9 (159.56)
Average extreme snow depth inches (cm)	9.0 (23)	8.8 (22)	5.9 (15)	1.0 (2.5)	0.0 (0.0)	0.0 (0.0)	0.0 (0.0)	0.0 (0.0)	0.0 (0.0)	0.2 (0.51)	3.1 (7.9)	5.6 (14)	12.2 (31)
Average precipitation days (≥ 0.01 in)	16.5	12.6	12.4	13.0	12.9	12.5	10.5	9.5	9.6	11.6	12.3	14.1	147.5
Average snowy days (≥ 0.1 in)	10.5	7.5	4.6	0.8	0.0	0.0	0.0	0.0	0.0	0.2	2.0	6.5	32.1
Source 1: NOAA
Source 2: National Weather Service

== Demographics ==
Historical population
Census	Pop.	Note	%±
1880	144		—
1900	659		—
1910	422		−36.0%
1920	453		7.3%
1930	441		−2.6%
1940	389		−11.8%
1950	986		153.5%
1960	1,011		2.5%
1970	1,484		46.8%
1980	1,360		−8.4%
1990	1,330		−2.2%
2000	1,242		−6.6%
2010	1,406		13.2%
2020	996		−29.2%
2023 (est.)	945	▼	−5.1%
U.S. Decennial Census

=== 2010 census ===
As of the census of 2010, there were 1,406 people, 228 households, and 120 families living in the village. The population density was 1,511.8 inhabitants per square mile (583.7/km^{2}). There were 248 housing units at an average density of 266.7 per square mile (103.0/km^{2}). The racial makeup of the village was 85.3% White, 8.2% African American, 0.4% Native American, 3.3% Asian, 0.6% from other races, and 2.1% from two or more races. Hispanic or Latino of any race were 2.1% of the population.

There were 228 households, of which 25.4% had children under the age of 18 living with them, 38.6% were married couples living together, 8.3% had a female householder with no husband present, 5.7% had a male householder with no wife present, and 47.4% were non-families. 31.1% of all households were made up of individuals, and 8.8% had someone living alone who was 65 years of age or older. The average household size was 2.35 and the average family size was 3.01.

The median age in the village was 21 years. 8.1% of residents were under the age of 18; 69.7% were between the ages of 18 and 24; 7.1% were from 25 to 44; 10.3% were from 45 to 64; and 4.8% were 65 years of age or older. The gender makeup of the village was 48.7% male and 51.3% female.

=== 2000 census ===
As of the census of 2000, there were 1,242 people, 234 households, and 147 families living in the village. The population density was 1,367.2 inhabitants per square mile (527.9/km^{2}). There were 249 housing units at an average density of 274.1 per square mile (105.8/km^{2}). The racial makeup of the village was 91.22% White, 5.39% African American, 1.45% Asian, 0.40% from other races, and 1.53% from two or more races. Hispanic or Latino of any race were 1.61% of the population.

There were 234 households, out of which 33.3% had children under the age of 18 living with them, 48.3% were married couples living together, 12.4% had a female householder with no husband present, and 36.8% were non-families. 28.2% of all households were made up of individuals, and 3.8% had someone living alone who was 65 years of age or older. The average household size was 2.44 and the average family size was 3.04.

In the village, the population was spread out, with 13.0% under the age of 18, 58.5% from 18 to 24, 15.4% from 25 to 44, 9.4% from 45 to 64, and 3.7% who were 65 years of age or older. The median age was 21 years. For every 100 females there were 92.0 males. For every 100 females age 18 and over, there were 91.8 males.

The median income for a household in the village was $45,417, and the median income for a family was $50,139. Males had a median income of $36,932 versus $25,625 for females. The per capita income for the village was $17,734. About 1.4% of families and 4.3% of the population were below the poverty line, including 2.1% of those under age 18 and none of those age 65 or over.

== Notable people ==
- The Garfield family:
  - Harry Augustus Garfield; son of James A. Garfield, president of Williams College from 1908 to 1934
  - James A. Garfield; U.S. President from March to September 1881
  - James Rudolph Garfield; son of James A. Garfield, 23rd United States Secretary of the Interior under Theodore Roosevelt
  - Lucretia Garfield; wife of James A. Garfield, First Lady of the United States from March to September 1881
- Grace Evelyn Pickford (1902–1986), biologist and endocrinologist
- Jesse Brown Pounds; songwriter
- Jack Trice; college football player at Iowa State, namesake of Jack Trice Stadium
