= Mollie Garfield =

James A. Garfield's daughter (1867–1947)

Mary "Mollie" Garfield Stanley-Brown
- Mary "Mollie" Stanley-Brown - 1911

Personal details
- Born: 1867 Washington, D.C., U.S.
- Died: 1947 (aged 79–80) Pasadena, California, U.S.
- Resting place: James A. Garfield Memorial
- Spouse: Joseph Stanley-Brown
- Relations: Harry Augustus Garfield (brother); James Rudolph Garfield (brother); Abram Garfield (brother); Herbert Feis (son-in-law)
- Children: 3, including Margaret Stanley-Brown
- Parent: James A. Garfield Lucretia Garfield

Mary "Mollie" Garfield Stanley-Brown (1867 – 1947) was a daughter of James A. Garfield, the 20th president of the United States. She was Garfield's only surviving daughter. Her daughter Ruth Stanley-Brown Feis (1892–1981) wrote a book about her.

== Early life, education and community activities ==
Mollie and her father, 1865

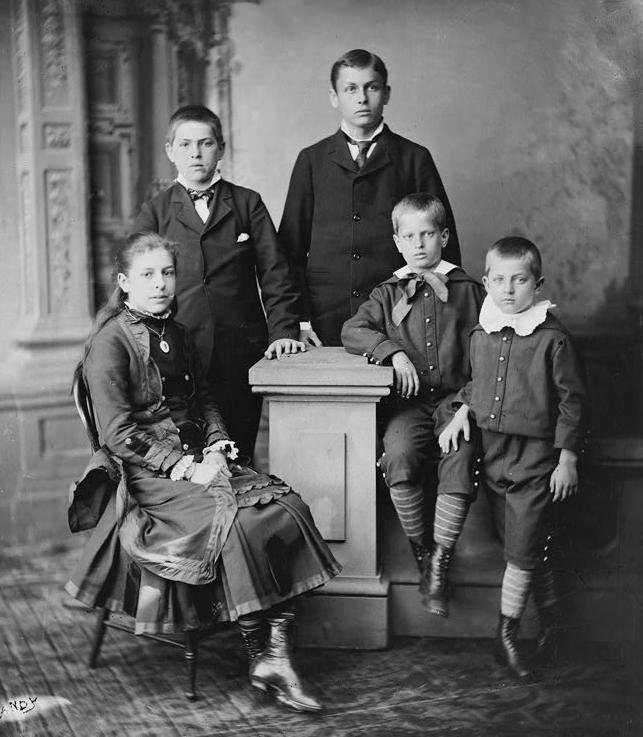
Mary "Mollie" Garfield (far left) and siblings.

Mary, called "Mollie" was born in 1867 in Washington, D.C., the fourth child of James A. Garfield and Lucretia Garfield. She was the Garfield's only surviving daughter after their firstborn daughter died in infancy.

Mollie was 14 when her father became President of the United States in January, 1881. Her education included Miss Mittleberger's School for Girls in Cleveland, Ohio and one semester at Miss Porter's Finishing School in Farmington, Connecticut.

After and during her marriage, Mollie was active in civic affairs in New York and Pasadena, California.

== Response to and life after Garfield's assassination ==
Mollie and her mother at the bedside of James Garfield, July 1881

On July 2, 1881, James Garfield was shot at the Baltimore and Potomac Railroad Station in Washington, D.C. Mollie and her mother were present when he died of his wounds on September 19.

In 1893, Mollie wrote:

…The day of the tragedy and darkness came, and there passed from our eyes, but never from our lives, one of the dearest comrades, one of the staunchest friends, one of the noblest fathers children ever had.”

Mollie, her mother Lucretia, and sister-in-law Lide Rudolph formed a ladies’ literary and social club, The “Miscellany Club,” organized in 1898 and still exists today. Lucretia joined Mollie and her family in Pasadena, California, where they had moved. When Lucretia died of pneumonia after a brief illness at her Pasadena home on March 13, 1918. Mollie was at her side.

== Personal life ==
Mollie married Joseph Stanley-Brown in a double wedding with her brother Hal Garfield in 1888. Stanley-Brown was an American geologist and banker who served as private secretary to Mollie's father during his brief presidency.

A great-great-great-great-granddaughter is named after Mollie.

== See also ==
- List of children of presidents of the United States

== Books ==
Feis, Ruth S. B. (1963) Mollie Garfield in the White House. Rand McNally & Co

== Portrayals ==
Mollie was portrayed in the 2025 Netflix series Death by Lightning by British actress Laura Marcus.
