= Assassination of James A. Garfield =

1881 shooting in Washington, D.C.

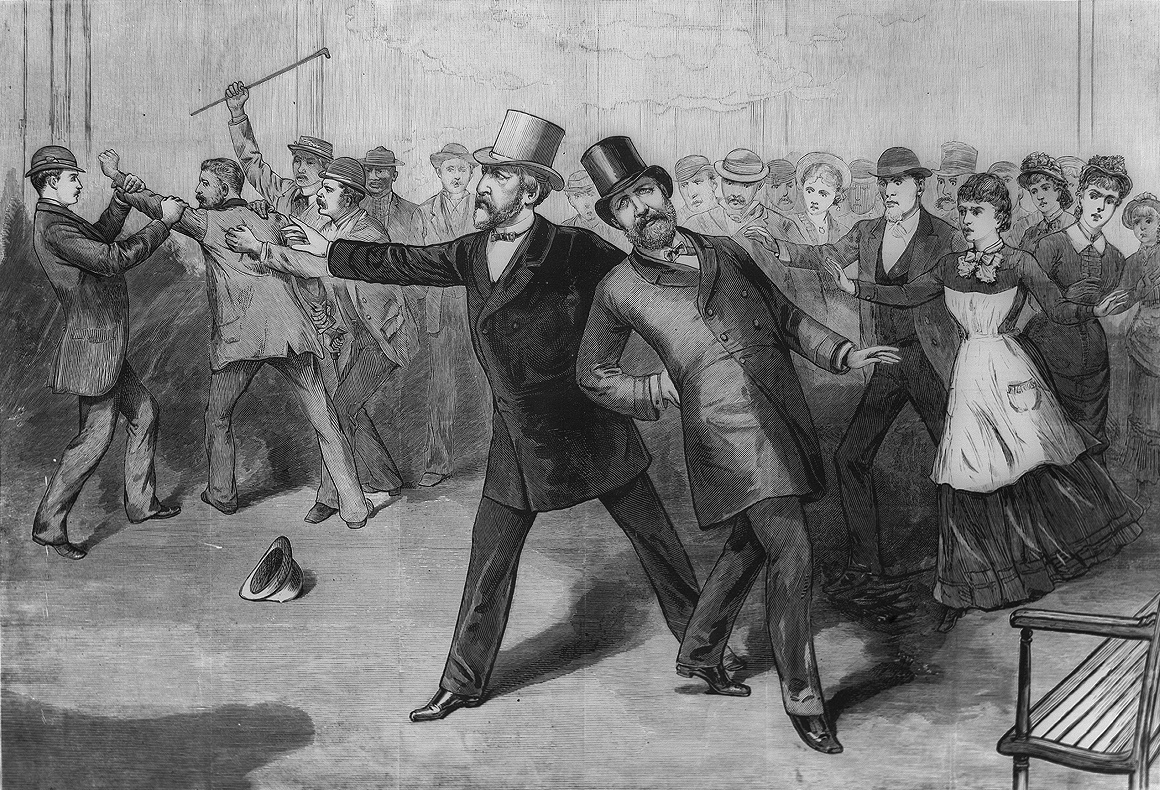
- President Garfield with James G. Blaine after being shot by Charles J. Guiteau
- Location: 38°53′31″N 77°01′13″W; Baltimore and Potomac Railroad Station, Washington, D.C., U.S.
- Date: July 2, 1881, 145 years ago 9:30 am (Local mean time)
- Target: James Abram Garfield
- Attack type: Assassination
- Weapon: British Bull Dog revolver
- Deaths: 1 (Garfield; died on September 19, 1881 as a result of infection)
- Motive: Mental illness; Retribution for perceived failure to reward campaign support; Desire for Chester A. Arthur to assume the presidency
- Verdict: Guilty
- Convictions: First degree murder
- Sentence: Death by hanging
- Convicted: Charles Julius Guiteau

On July 2, 1881, at 9:30 AM, James A. Garfield, the 20th president of the United States, was shot at the Baltimore and Potomac Railroad Station in Washington, D.C., less than four months into his term as president.

The assassin was Charles J. Guiteau, a mentally ill and delusional office seeker, who had distributed copies of a speech he wrote aimed at promoting Garfield in the 1880 United States presidential election. Guiteau believed his campaigning had been vital to Garfield's eventual victory, and that Garfield owed him a diplomatic post in Europe for his assistance. After months of failed attempts to solicit such a reward from the Garfield administration, he purchased a revolver and began stalking Garfield with the goal of assassinating him, hoping that if he succeeded in doing so, Garfield's vice president Chester A. Arthur would give him the job he wanted upon assuming the presidency.

Guiteau shot Garfield twice from behind; one bullet grazed Garfield; the other entered his back. Garfield was carried back to the White House, where he underwent medical treatment for over two months. His condition fluctuated, though generally worsened over time as he began to suffer from septic shock. His treatment in part consisted of doctors trying in vain to find the bullet still lodged in his body; by doing so, they likely aggravated his existing wounds and introduced new sources of infection, decreasing his chances of survival. Garfield was later transported by train to a mansion in Elberon, New Jersey, where he died at 10:30 p.m. on September 19 and was succeeded by his vice president, Chester A. Arthur. Garfield was the second American president to be assassinated, following Abraham Lincoln in 1865. Guiteau's trial was widely publicized, and his legal team's attempts to use the insanity defense failed. Guiteau was sentenced to death and executed by hanging.

== Background ==
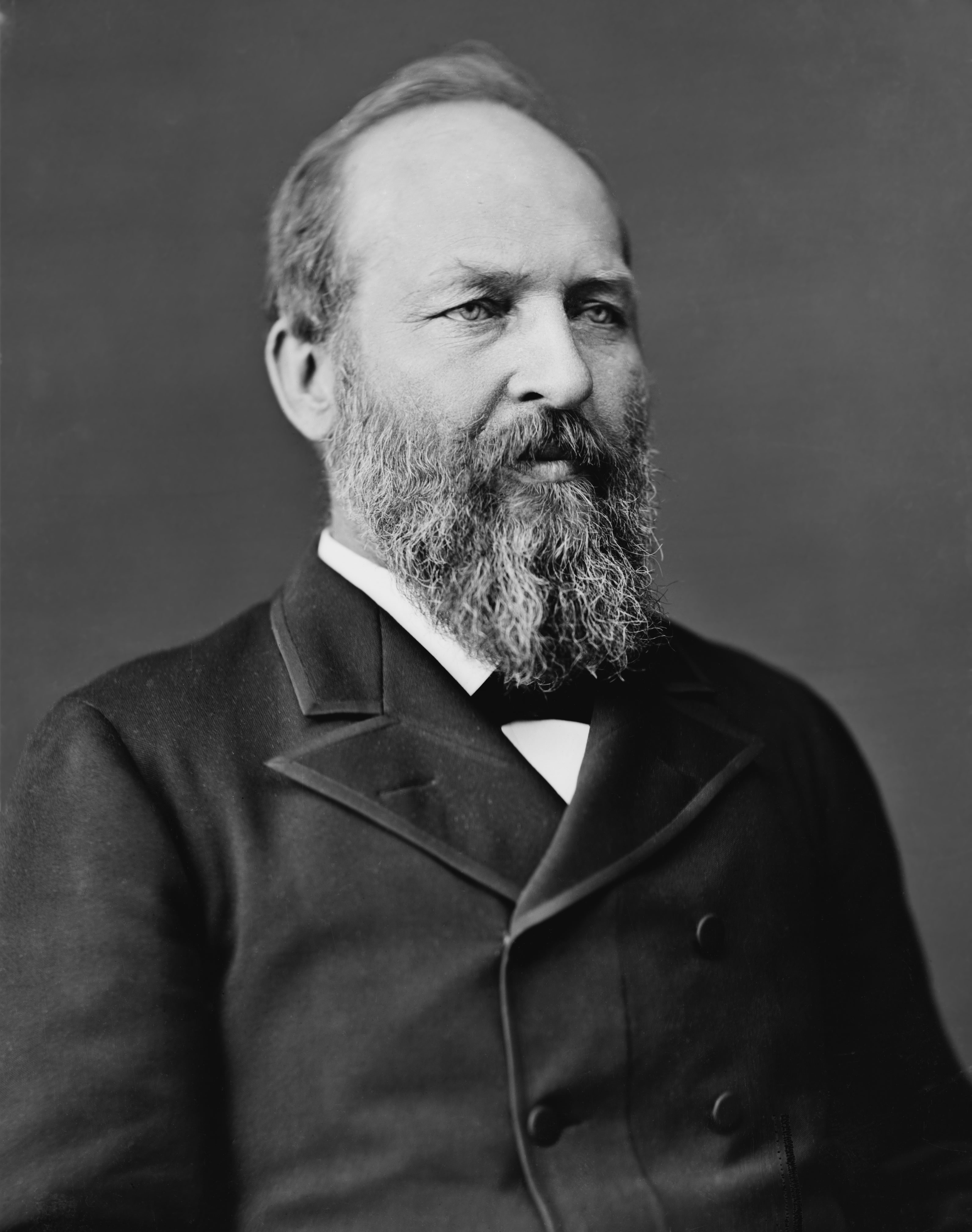
James A. Garfield in 1881

Guiteau had turned to politics after failing in several ventures, including theology, a law practice, bill collecting, and spending time in the utopian Oneida Community. Former President Ulysses S. Grant was the early front runner for the Republican presidential nomination in 1880 and was supported by the Stalwart faction. Guiteau became a Stalwart and a Grant supporter, and authored a speech, "Grant against Hancock".

When Grant lost the nomination to dark horse candidate James A. Garfield, who was not affiliated with either the Stalwarts or their rivals the Half-Breeds, Guiteau revised his speech to "Garfield against Hancock" and tried to sign on as a campaigner for the Republican ticket. He never delivered the speech in a public setting, but had it printed (he never paid the bill) and distributed several hundred copies. The speech was ineffective, even in written form; among other problems, Guiteau had made a hurried but incomplete effort to replace references to Grant with references to Garfield. The result was that Guiteau appeared to give Garfield credit for accomplishments that he had originally ascribed to Grant, yet he convinced himself that his speech was largely responsible for Garfield's narrow victory over Democratic nominee Winfield Scott Hancock. Guiteau believed he should be awarded a diplomatic post for his supposedly vital assistance, first asking for a consulship in Vienna, then expressing a willingness to "settle" for one in Paris. He loitered around Republican headquarters in New York City during the winter of 1880–1881, expecting rewards for his speech, but to no avail.

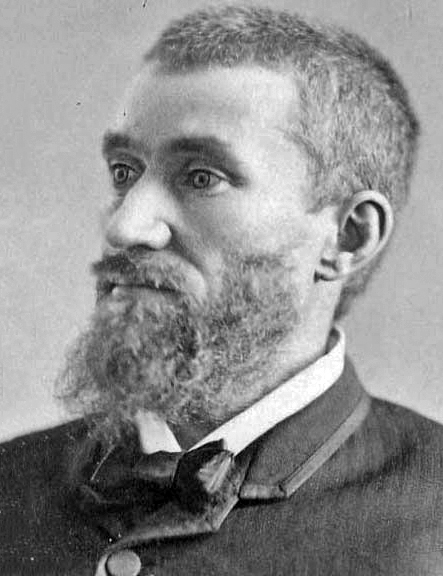
Charles J. Guiteau in 1881

Guiteau arrived in Washington, D.C., on March 5, 1881, the day after Garfield's inauguration, still believing that he would be rewarded. He obtained entrance to the White House and saw the President on March 8, 1881, dropping off a copy of his speech as a reminder of the campaign work which he had done on Garfield's behalf. Guiteau spent the next two months roaming around Washington, staying at rooming houses and sneaking away without paying for his meals and lodging. He passed his days loitering in hotel lobbies to read old newspapers and using hotel stationery to write letters to those who he thought could help him obtain an appointment from Garfield. In addition, he spent time shuffling back and forth between the State Department and the White House and approaching various Cabinet members and prominent Republicans to press his claim, all without success. Guiteau was destitute and increasingly slovenly because he was wearing the same clothes every day, and would walk through the cold, snowy city without overcoat, hat, gloves, or boots. On May 13, 1881, he was banned from the White House waiting room. The following day, he encountered Secretary of State James G. Blaine, who told him, "Never speak to me again on the Paris consulship as long as you live."

Guiteau's family had judged him to be insane in 1875 and attempted to have him committed, but he had escaped. Now his mania took a violent turn, and he decided that he had been commanded by a higher power to kill the President. He later stated, "I leave my justification to God."

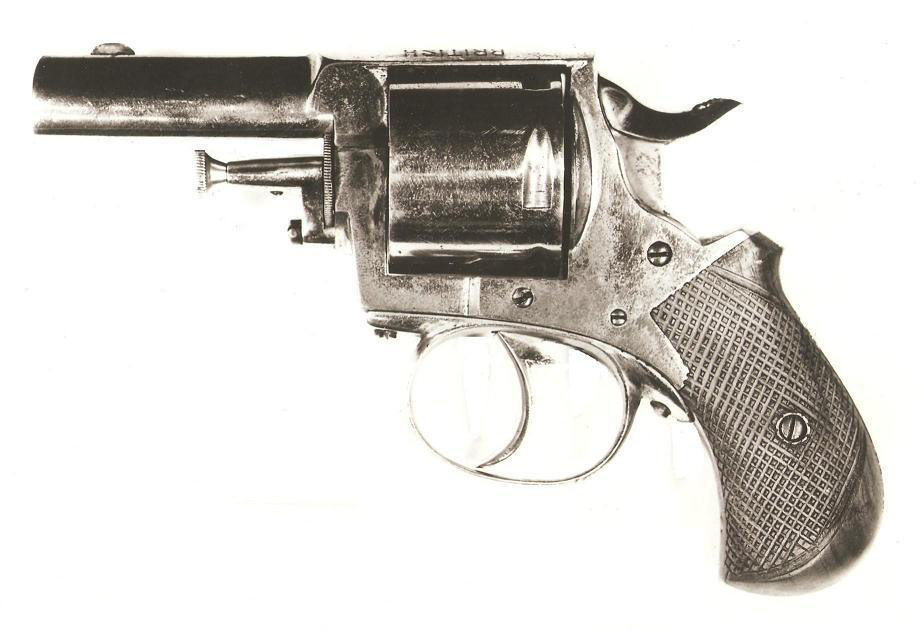
The .44 British Bulldog revolver that Guiteau used to shoot Garfield

Guiteau borrowed $15 (equivalent to $500 in 2025) from George Maynard, a relative by marriage, then went out to purchase a revolver. He knew little about firearms, but he believed that he would need a large caliber gun. O'Meara's store in Washington provided a choice between two versions of the .442 Webley caliber British Bulldog revolver, one with a wood grip and another with an ivory grip. He favored ivory because he thought that it would look better as a museum exhibit after the assassination, but could not afford the extra dollar, so the store owner dropped the price for him. (Note: Another source describes Guiteau's revolver as having wood grips.) (The handgun was recovered and displayed by the Smithsonian in the early 20th century, but it has since been lost.) Guiteau spent the next few weeks stalking Garfield and in target practice; the recoil kick from the gun almost knocked him over the first time that he fired it. He wrote a letter to Garfield, saying that he should fire Blaine or "you and the Republican party will come to grief". The letter was ignored, as was all the correspondence that Guiteau sent to the White House.

Guiteau continued to prepare carefully; he wrote a letter to William Tecumseh Sherman, the Commanding General of the Army, asking for protection from the mob that he assumed would gather after he killed the President, and he wrote other letters justifying his action as necessary to heal dissension between the factions of the Republican Party. He went to the District of Columbia jail to ask for a tour of the facility where he expected to be incarcerated, but he was told to come back later. He spent the whole month of June following Garfield around Washington. On one occasion, Guiteau trailed Garfield to the railway station as he was seeing his wife, Lucretia Garfield, off to a beach resort in Long Branch, New Jersey; he decided not to shoot the President then, as Lucretia was known to be in poor health and he did not want to upset her.

== Assassination ==
=== Shooting ===
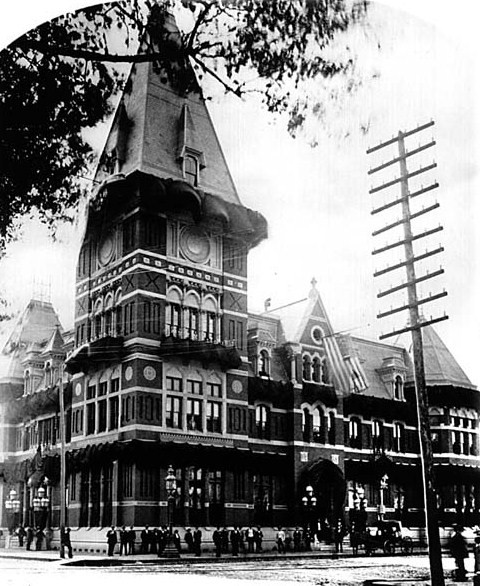
Baltimore and Potomac Railroad Station, Washington, D.C., where Garfield was shot on July 2, 1881

Garfield was scheduled to leave Washington on July 2, 1881, for his summer vacation, which was reported in the Washington newspapers, Guiteau arrived by a hired carriage at the Baltimore and Potomac Railroad Station on the southwest corner of Sixth Street and Constitution Avenue NW in Washington. Having been alerted to the president's schedule by a newspaper article, Guiteau lay in wait at the railroad station, getting his shoes shined, pacing, and engaging a cab to take him to the police station to turn himself in after the shooting. Garfield came to the station on his way to his alma mater Williams College, where he was scheduled to deliver a speech before beginning his vacation. He was accompanied by his sons James and Harry, and by Secretary of State James G. Blaine; Secretary of War Robert Todd Lincoln waited at the station to see him off. Garfield had no bodyguard or security detail; early presidents did not employ them, with the exception of Abraham Lincoln during the Civil War.

As Garfield entered the station's waiting room, Guiteau stepped forward and shot the president at point-blank range from behind. Garfield cried out, "My God, what is this?", flinging up his arms. Guiteau fired again, and Garfield collapsed. The first bullet grazed the President's shoulder, and the other struck him in the back, passing the first lumbar vertebra but missing the spinal cord before coming to rest behind his pancreas. Guiteau put his gun back in his pocket and turned to leave via a cab that he had waiting for him outside the station, but he collided with policeman Patrick Kearney, who was entering the station after hearing the gunfire.

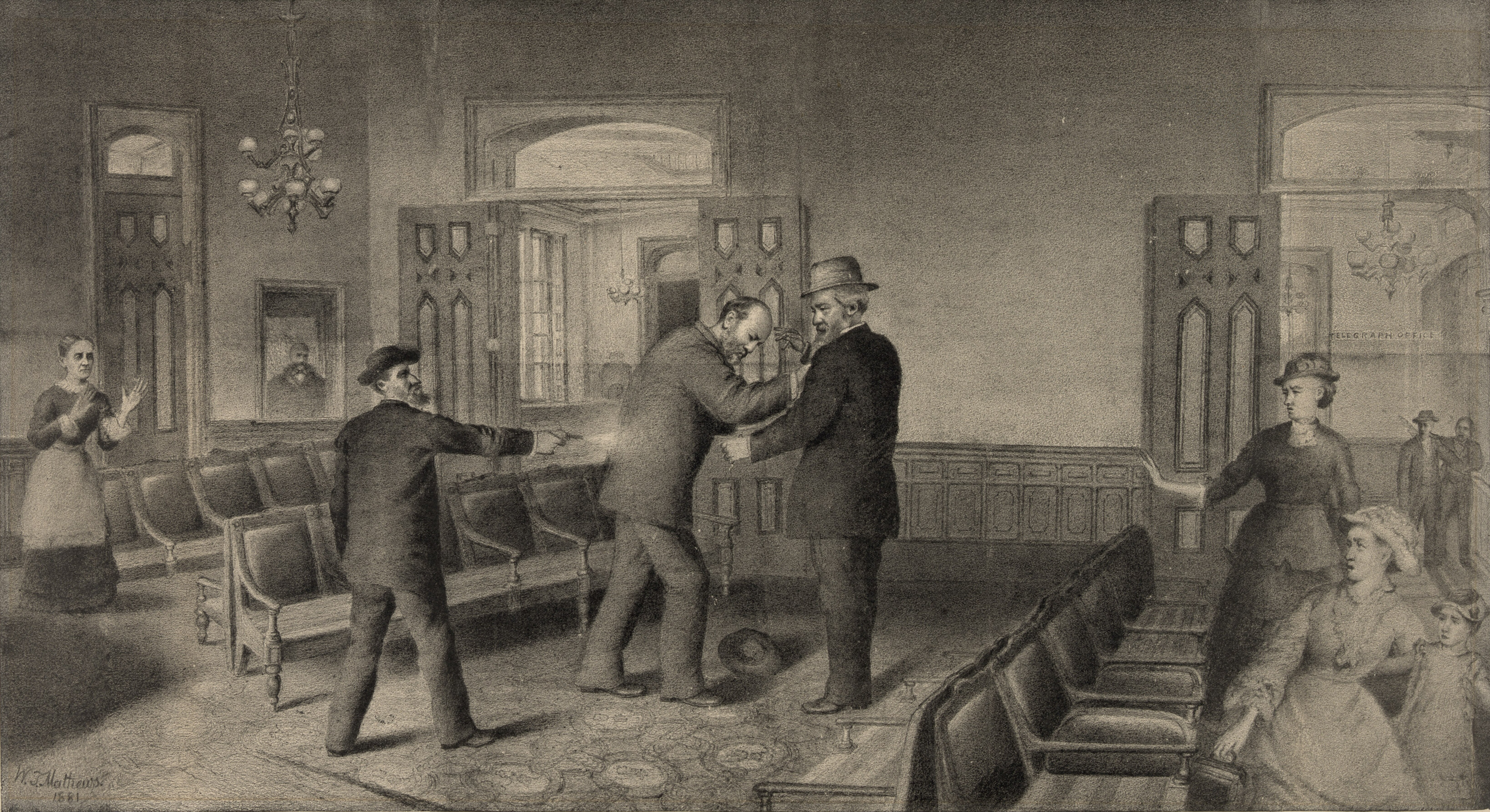
Contemporaneous illustration of Guiteau shooting Garfield

Kearney apprehended Guiteau and was so excited at having arrested the man who had shot the president that he neglected to take the gun from him until after they arrived at the police station. Kearney demanded, "In God's name, man, what did you shoot the President for?" Guiteau responded, "I am a Stalwart, and want Arthur for President." The rapidly gathering crowd screamed, "Lynch him", but Kearney and several other police officers took Guiteau to the police station a few blocks away. As he surrendered to authorities, Guiteau uttered the exulting words, repeated everywhere: "I am a Stalwart of the Stalwarts! I did it, and I want to be arrested! Arthur is President now!" In a letter left for the White House dated the day of the shooting, Guiteau elaborated: "The President's tragic death was a sad necessity, but it will unite the Republican party and save the republic... I had no ill-will toward the President. His death was a political necessity. I am a lawyer, a theologian, and a politician. I am a Stalwart of the Stalwarts." He also noted that he had left papers for the press at 1420 New York Avenue before turning himself in. This statement briefly led to unfounded suspicions that either Vice President Chester A. Arthur or his supporters had put Guiteau up to the crime.

The Stalwarts were a Republican faction loyal to Senator Roscoe Conkling; they supported Grant for a third term in 1880 and strongly opposed Blaine's Half-Breeds. Garfield was unaffiliated with either faction, but Blaine had given his support to Garfield once it became clear that Blaine could not win the presidential nomination. Arthur, a Conkling ally, had been selected as Garfield's running mate to placate the Stalwart faction. As a self-professed Stalwart, Guiteau convinced himself that by removing Garfield, he was striking a blow to unite the two factions of the Republican Party.

=== Treatment and death ===
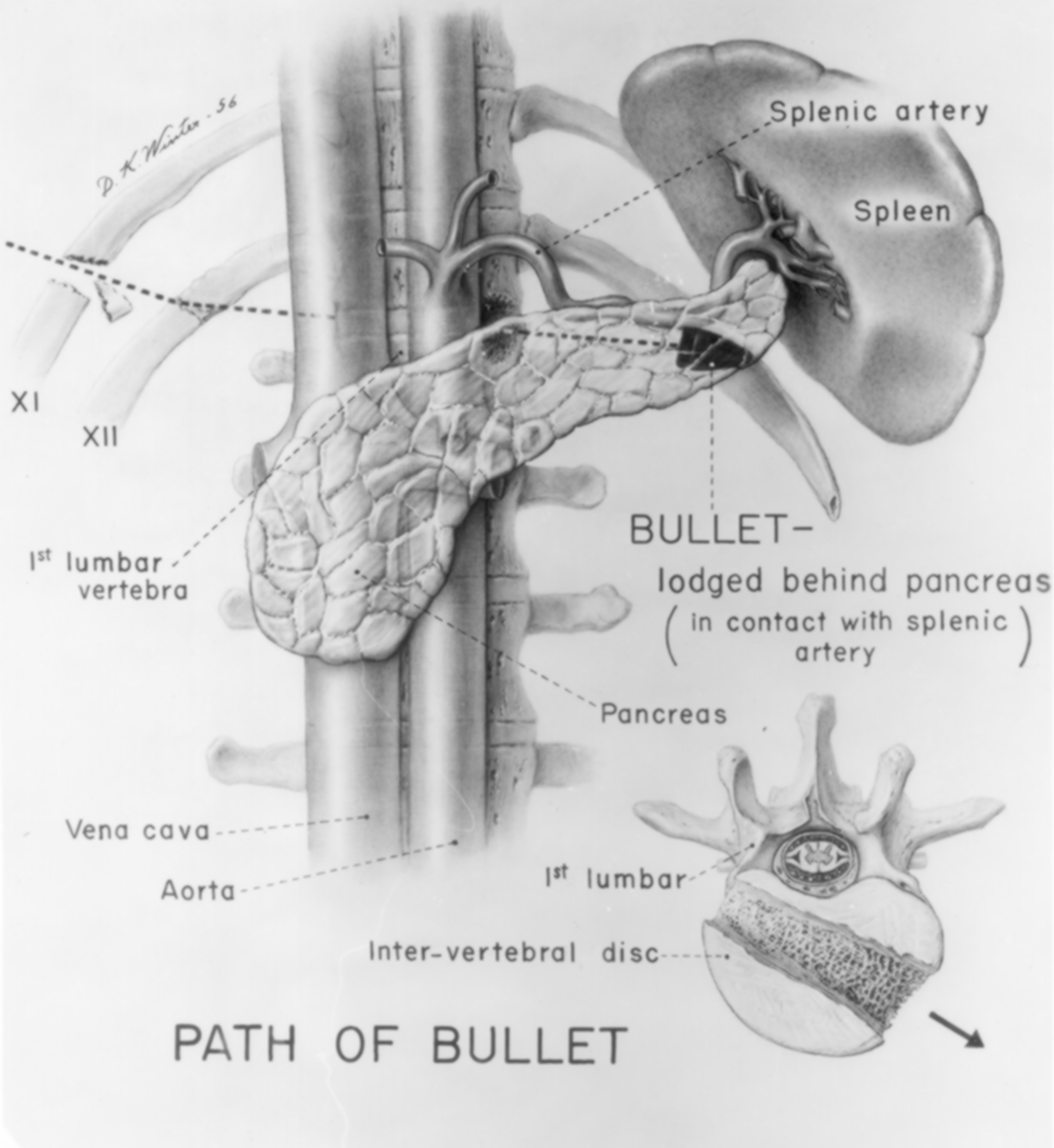
Path of the bullet that wounded Garfield

Tended to by Dr. Charles Purvis, who became the first African-American physician to attend to a sitting president, Garfield was carried to an upstairs floor of the railway station, conscious but in shock. One bullet remained lodged in his body, but doctors could not find it. Robert Lincoln was deeply upset, thinking back to the assassination of his father, 16 years earlier; he said, "How many hours of sorrow I have passed in this town." He would again be near a presidential assassination 20 years later, when President William McKinley was shot at the Pan-American Exposition in Buffalo, which Robert was attending.

Garfield was carried back to the White House, and doctors told him that he would not survive the night; nevertheless, he remained conscious and alert. The next morning, his vital signs were good and doctors began to hope for recovery. Garfield gave a speech at an Independence Day Parade in Washington D.C. on July 4. He was feeling better and recovering and decided to give speeches everywhere in the United States, despite having two bullets lodged inside his body. A long vigil began, and Garfield's doctors issued regular bulletins that the American public followed closely throughout the summer of 1881. Garfield's condition fluctuated; fevers came and went, he struggled to keep down solid food, and he spent most of the summer consuming only liquids.

Navy engineers rigged up an air cooler to relieve Garfield from the heat of a Washington summer. Fans blew air over a large box of ice and into the President's sickroom, and the device worked well enough to lower the temperature 20 degrees (Fahrenheit). Doctors continued to probe Garfield's wound with unsterilized fingers and instruments, attempting to find the bullet, and Alexander Graham Bell devised a metal detector specifically to find it. He was unsuccessful, partly because Garfield's metal bedframe made the instrument malfunction, and partly because self-appointed chief physician Doctor Willard Bliss allowed Bell to use the device only on Garfield's right side, where Bliss insisted the bullet had lodged. Bell's subsequent tests indicated his metal detector was in good working order and that he would have found the bullet had he been allowed to use the device on Garfield's left side.

On July 29, Garfield met with his Cabinet for the only time during his illness; the members were under strict instruction from the doctors not to discuss anything upsetting. Garfield became increasingly ill over a period of several weeks due to infection, which caused his heart to weaken. He remained bedridden in the White House with fevers and extreme pains. His weight dropped from 210 pounds (95 kilograms) to 130 pounds (58 kilograms) as his inability to keep down and digest food took its toll. Nutrient enemas were given in an attempt to extend his life because he could not digest food. Septic shock set in, and the President suffered from hallucinations for a time. Pus-filled abscesses spread all over his body as the infections raged.

Garfield's condition worsened under the oppressive summer weather in Washington. By the time he returned to New Jersey on September 6, he insisted on buying a house in Elberon to relax and watch the sunset every night. On September 15, he gave his final Speech in Atlantic City. The next day, after eating supper and watching the sunset, he began to feel sick again and became bedridden. Garfield was propped up in bed before a window with a view of the beach and ocean. New infections set in, as well as spasms of angina. He died of septic shock , following sepsis, bronchial pneumonia, and a ruptured spleen at 10:35 pm on Monday, September 19, 1881, in Elberon, New Jersey, two months before his 50th birthday. During the 79 days between his shooting and death, Garfield's only official act was to sign a request for the extradition of a forger who had escaped and was apprehended after he fled to Canada.

Most historians and medical experts now believe that Garfield probably would have survived his wound had the doctors been more capable. Unlike their peers in Europe, most American doctors of the day did not believe in anti-sepsis measures or the need for cleanliness to prevent infection. Several inserted their unwashed fingers into the wound to probe for the bullet, and one doctor punctured Garfield's liver in doing so. Also, Bliss had supplanted Garfield's physician Jedediah Hyde Baxter. Bliss and the other doctors who attended Garfield had guessed wrong about the path of the bullet in his body; they had probed rightward into his back instead of leftward, missing the location of the bullet but creating a new channel which filled with pus. The autopsy, conducted by U.S. Army pathologist and surgeon Dr. Daniel S. Lamb, discovered this error and revealed pneumonia in both lungs and a body that was filled with pus due to uncontrolled septic shock.

The conventional narrative regarding Garfield's post-shooting medical condition was challenged by Theodore N. Pappas and Shahrzad Joharifard in a 2013 article in The American Journal of Surgery, in which they argued that the President died from a late rupture of a pseudoaneurysm affecting the splenic artery, which developed secondary to the path of the bullet adjacent to the splenic artery. They also argued that his sepsis was actually caused by post-traumatic acute acalculous cholecystitis (inflammation of the gallbladder). Based on the autopsy report, the authors speculate that Garfield's gallbladder subsequently ruptured, leading to the development of a large bile-containing abscess adjacent to the gallbladder. Pappas and Joharifard say this caused the septic decline in Garfield's condition that was visible starting from July 23, 1881.

Arthur was at his home in New York City when word came the night of September 19 that Garfield had died. He said, "I hope—my God, I do hope it is a mistake", but confirmation by telegram came soon after. President Arthur was inaugurated early in the morning on September 20, and he took the presidential oath of office from John R. Brady, a New York Supreme Court judge. Arthur then left for Long Branch to pay his respects to Mrs. Garfield before going on to Washington.

Garfield's body was taken by special train from Elberon to Washington, with crowds gathering at every station along the route and mourning draped across depots as the train passed; in Baltimore, crowds demonstrated their sympathy as the procession moved through the city. The body lay in state in the Capitol Rotunda, where it was placed in a black walnut casket with silver handles and white satin lining, bearing a silver plate reading "Died, President of the United States, September 19, 1881", surrounded by immortelles and palm leaves beneath the massive dome. Thousands filed through in silence to pay their respects before the body was taken to Cleveland, Ohio, where the funeral was held on September 26.

== Trial and execution ==
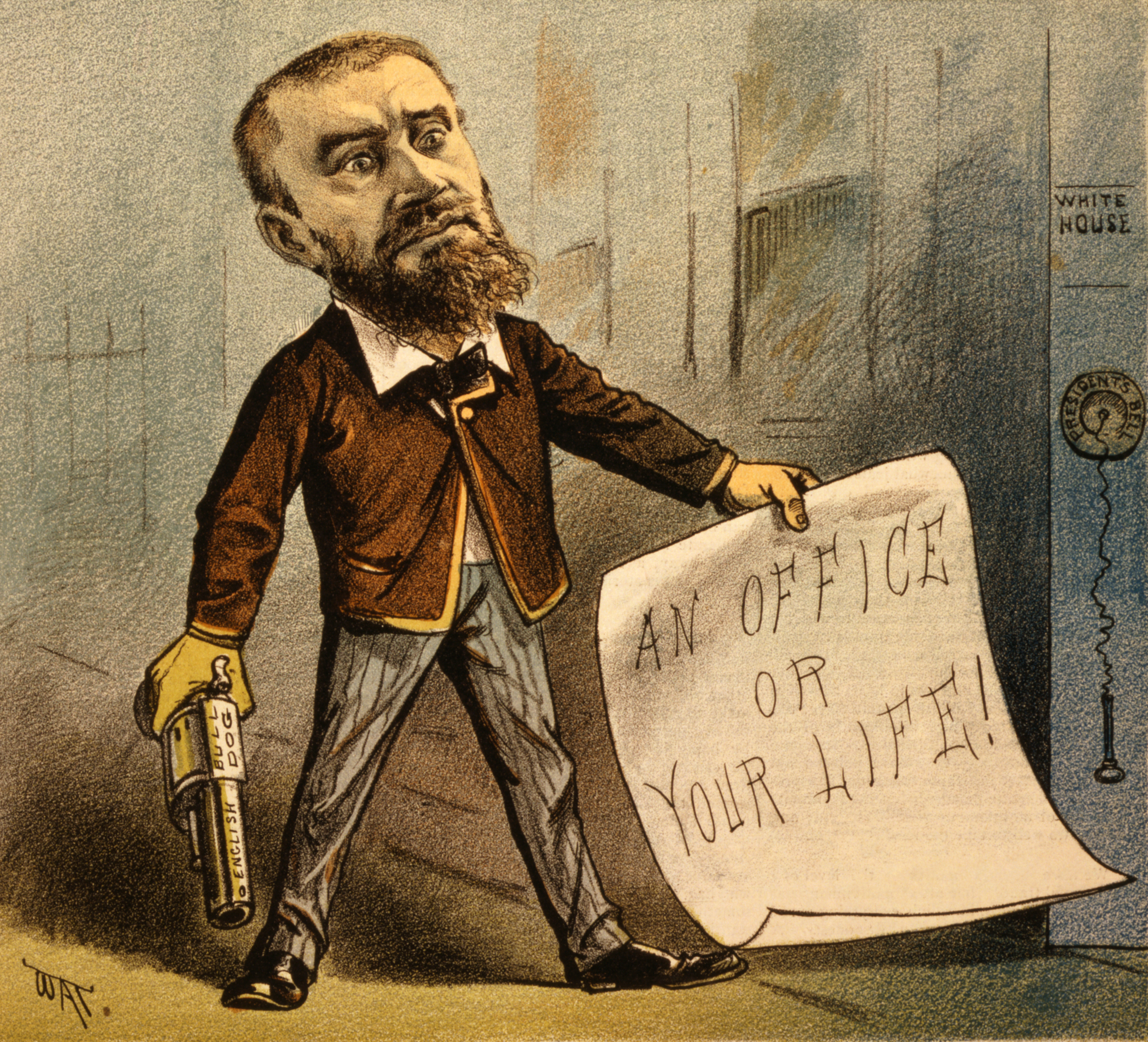
1881 political cartoon of Guiteau holding a pistol and a sign saying "An Office Or Your Life!"

Guiteau went on trial in November, represented by his brother-in-law George Scoville. He received ample media attention during his trial for his bizarre behavior, including constantly insulting his defense team, formatting his testimony in epic poems which he recited at length, and soliciting legal advice from random spectators in the audience via passed notes. Guiteau claimed that he was not guilty because Garfield's murder was the will of God and he was only an instrument of it. He sang "John Brown's Body" to the court. He dictated an autobiography to the New York Herald, ending it with a personal ad for a nice Christian lady under 30. He was oblivious to the American public's outrage and hatred of him, even after he was almost killed twice himself—once while in prison, and again while being transported there. At one point, Guiteau argued that Garfield was killed not by him but by medical malpractice: "I deny the killing, if your honor please. We admit the shooting." Under the felony murder rule, however, Guiteau was still legally responsible for Garfield's death even if it did not occur as the direct result of the shooting. He was housed at St. Elizabeths Hospital in the southeastern quadrant of Washington, D.C., throughout the trial and up until his execution.

Guiteau's trial was one of the first high-profile cases in the United States where the insanity defense was considered. Guiteau vehemently insisted that he had been legally insane at the time of the shooting, but he was not really medically insane, which caused a major rift with his defense lawyers, and which probably contributed to the jury's impression that Guiteau was merely trying to deny responsibility.

Guiteau was actively making plans to start a lecture tour after his release and to run for president himself in 1884; at the same time, he delighted in the media circus surrounding his trial. Guiteau was dismayed when the jury was unconvinced of his divine inspiration, convicting him of Garfield's murder on January 25, 1882, and sentencing him to death. He appealed, but his appeal was rejected, and he dropped to his death on the gallows on June 30, 1882, just two days before the first anniversary of the shooting, at the District of Columbia jail.

== Aftermath ==
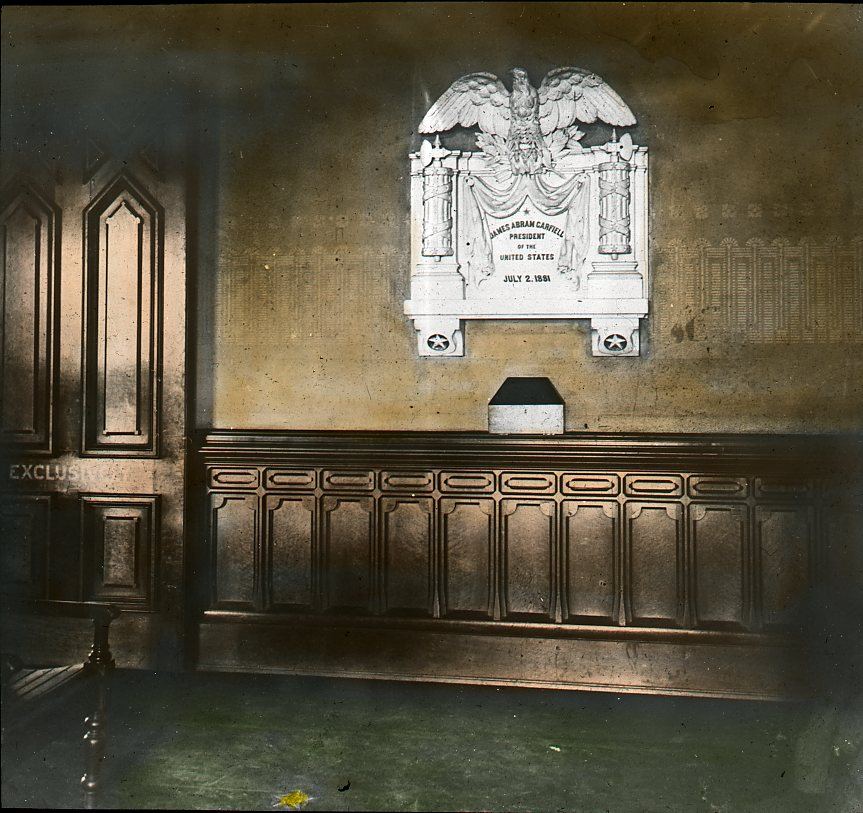
Memorial to President Garfield in the former train station. The gold star on the floor marked his location when he was shot.

Part of Guiteau's preserved brain is on display at the Mütter Museum at the College of Physicians of Philadelphia. Guiteau's bones and more of his brain, along with Garfield's backbone and a few ribs, are kept at the National Museum of Health and Medicine, at the Army's Forest Glen Annex in Silver Spring, Maryland. Garfield's assassination was instrumental to the passage of the Pendleton Civil Service Reform Act on January 16, 1883. Garfield himself had called for civil service reform in his inaugural address and supported it as president in the belief that it would make government more efficient. It was passed as something of a memorial to the fallen President. Arthur, himself in poor health by 1884, did not actively seek the Republican nomination which went to James G. Blaine. Blaine went on to lose a close election to Democrat Grover Cleveland.

The Baltimore and Potomac Railroad Station was later demolished after being replaced by Washington Union Station. The site is now occupied by the West Building of the National Gallery of Art. The National Park Service in 2018 placed permanent wayside signs to mark the spot of the assassination and to honor Garfield. A few blocks away the James A. Garfield Monument stands on the southwest corner of the U.S. Capitol grounds.

The question of Presidential disability was not addressed. Article II, section 1, clause 6 of the U.S. Constitution says that in case of the "Inability [of the President] to discharge the Powers and Duties of the said Office, the same shall devolve on the Vice President", but gives no further instruction on what constitutes inability or how the President's inability should be determined. Garfield had lain on his sickbed for 79 days without performing any of the duties of his office except for the signing of an extradition paper, but this did not prove to be a difficulty because in the 19th century the federal government effectively shut down for the summer regardless. During Garfield's ordeal, Congress was not in session and there was little for a president to do. Blaine suggested the Cabinet declare Arthur acting president, but this option was rejected by all, including Arthur, who did not wish to be perceived as grasping for power.

Congress did not deal with the problem of what to do if a president were alive but incapacitated as Garfield was, nor did the Congress take up the question thirty-eight years later, when Woodrow Wilson suffered a stroke that put him in a coma for days and left him partially paralyzed and blind in one eye for the last year and a half of his presidency. The Twenty-fifth Amendment was ratified in 1967 and provides an official procedure when the incapacity of a president is recognized.

Garfield, like many other presidents of his time, often traveled on public infrastructure without any type of personal security protection. It would not be until the assassination of William McKinley some twenty years later that Congress would finally task the United States Secret Service (founded to prevent counterfeiting) with the responsibility of ensuring the president's personal safety.

== See also ==
- Assassination of Carter Harrison III – 1893 assassination of Chicago's mayor, circumstances of which drew frequent comparison to Garfield's assassination
- Assassination of William McKinley – 1901 assassination in Buffalo, New York, U.S.
- Assassination of John F. Kennedy – 1963 assassination in Dallas, Texas
- Assassination Vacation – 2005 book by Sarah Vowell
- Garfield Tea House – Commemorative structure in New Jersey
- List of incidents of political violence in Washington, D.C.
- List of United States presidential assassination attempts and plots
- Spoils system – Elected party giving jobs to supporters
