= Senator Garfield =

Senator Garfield may refer to:

- James A. Garfield (1831–1881), Ohio State Senate
- James Rudolph Garfield (1865–1950), Ohio State Senate
