= Herbert Feis =

American historian

- Herbert Feis, c. 1955
- Born: June 7, 1893; Vanndale, Arkansas, U.S.
- Died: March 2, 1972 (aged 78); Hamden, Connecticut, U.S.
- Education: Emory University (BA); Columbia University (MA); University of North Carolina, Chapel Hill (PhD)
- Spouse(s): Ruth Stanley-Brown, daughter of Mollie Garfield and Joseph Stanley-Brown,granddaughter of James A. Garfield and Lucretia Garfield
- Awards: Bancroft Prize (1952); Pulitzer Prize for History (1961)
- Scientific career
- Workplaces: Yale University; Johns Hopkins University

Herbert Feis (June 7, 1893 – March 2, 1972) was an American historian, author, and economist who was the Advisor on International Economic Affairs (at that time, the highest-ranking economic official) in the US Department of State during the Herbert Hoover and Franklin Roosevelt administrations.

Based on this experience, his subsequent 25-year career was as a leading scholar of the U.S. diplomatic history of the World War II period. He developed that narrative in 11 books and won the annual Pulitzer Prize for History in 1961 for one of them, Between War and Peace: The Potsdam Conference (Princeton University Press, 1960), which features the Potsdam Conference and the origins of the Cold War.

== Early life and education ==
Feis was born in New York City. His parents, Louis Feis and Louise Waterman Feis, were Jewish immigrants from Alsace, France, who came to America in the late 1800s. His uncle invented the Waterman stove. As the family fortunes improved, they moved from the Lower East Side to the Upper West Side of Manhattan, where Feis' high school education was completed at the Townsend Harris Hall Prep School. He graduated from Harvard College, earning a Ph.D. in economics from Harvard.

== Career ==
Feis was an instructor at Harvard University (1920–1921), an associate professor of economics at the University of Kansas (1922–1925), and a professor and department head at the University of Cincinnati (1926–1929). He published a stream of scholarly studies.

From 1922 to 1927, Feis was also an adviser on the American economy to the International Labor Office (ILO) of the League of Nations, in Geneva, Switzerland. He was on the staff of the Council on Foreign Relations from 1930 to 1931. His first major book, Europe, the World's Banker, 1870-1914 (1930), impressed Secretary of State Henry L. Stimson, who recruited Feis to the State Department, where Feis remained from 1931 to 1943, advising Stimson and then Secretary of State Cordell Hull. He helped to shape the nation's international economic policies and represented the government at numerous international conferences including the World Economic and Monetary Conference of 1933 in London and the meetings of the Conference of American Republics held in Buenos Aires (1936), Lima (1938), and Panama (1939). As World War II approached, Feis chaired the government's Interdepartmental Committee to Stockpile Strategic and Critical Raw Materials. From 1943 through 1947, he rejoined Stimson, who was then Secretary of War.

After retiring from government service, Feis spent the next 25 years documenting the U.S., diplomatic history of the Pre-War, World War II, and early Cold War periods. He had access to secret documents as well as his own memories to trace the convoluted course that Washington followed in abandoning its traditional isolationism for a policy of global intervention. His books are sometimes considered to represent the "orthodox" interpretation of history. His analysis of the origins of the Cold War was challenged from the left during the Vietnam era, with the allegation that the Hiroshima and Nagasaki bombings were designed primarily to stop Soviet expansionism and thus caused the Cold War. However, scholarship since the 1980s has largely vindicated his interpretation of the use of nuclear weapons in 1945 as an effort to end the bloodshed as fast as possible.

== Criticism ==
According to the Dictionary of American Biography:

Feis was not without his critics. Some charged that as a "court historian" he could not write objectively about the government policies and actions that he himself had helped to formulate. His close involvement with the people and events about which he wrote, they said, "shackled" him to an "establishment line." One English critic described his 1960 prize-winning study of the Potsdam Conference as "a State Department brief, translated into terms of historical scholarship." But the dominant view was that while Feis's participation in events animated his narrative, he wrote objective history characterized by reasonably dispassionate analysis. As an insider with access to government documents closed to other scholars, he had an unusual advantage, a fact of which he was well aware. Perhaps because of this, he devoted much time during the 1960s trying to persuade government officials that they could open government documents to research scholars much sooner than was customary without jeopardizing the national security.

== Personal life ==
Ruth Stanley-Brown, wife of Herbert Feis and granddaughter of US president James A. Garfield and Lucretia Garfield.

Feis married Ruth Stanley-Brown, the granddaughter of US President James Garfield; they had a daughter.

Feis died in 1972 at the age of 78 in Winter Park, Florida.

== Legacy ==
The Herbert Feis Award is awarded annually since 1984 by the American Historical Association, a major professional society of historians, to recognize the recent work of public historians or independent scholars. Recipients include:Saul Cornell, Erin Kimmerle, Theodore Karamanski, Joan Neuberger, Lonnie Bunch, Naomi Oreskes, Rachel Maines, Liza Dalby, Edith Gelles, Burnett Bolloten, Theodore Draper and Thomas Doerflinger.

== Bibliography ==
- The Settlement of Wage Disputes (Macmillan, 1921) – his earliest work in the Library of Congress Catalog
- Europe the World's Banker, 1870-1914: an account of European foreign investment and the connection of world finance with diplomacy before the war (1930) online
- The Changing Pattern of International Economic Affairs (1940)
- Seen from E.A.: Three International Episodes (1947) online
- The Spanish Story: Franco and the Nations at War (1948) online
- The Road to Pearl Harbor: The Coming of the War Between the United States and Japan (1950) online
- The China Tangle: The American Effort in China from Pearl Harbor to the Marshall Mission (1953) online
- Churchill, Roosevelt, Stalin: The War They Waged and the Peace They Sought (1957)
- Between War and Peace: The Potsdam Conference (1960) (Pulitzer Prize) online
- Japan Subdued: The Atomic Bomb and the End of the War in the Pacific (1961)
- The Atomic Bomb and the End of World War II (1966)
- 1933: Characters in Crisis (1966)
- Contest over Japan (1967)
- The Birth of Israel (1969)
- From Trust to Terror: The Onset of the Cold War, 1945–1950 (1970)

== Sources ==
- Crapol, Edward. "Some reflections on the historiography of the cold war." The History Teacher 20.2 (1987): 251–262. online
- Doenecke, Justus. "Feis, Herbert" American National Biography online
- Goldberg, Stanley. "Racing to the Finish: The Decision to Bomb Hiroshima and Nagasaki." Journal of American-East Asian Relations (1995): 117–128. online
- Kort, Michael. "The Historiography of Hiroshima: The Rise and Fall of Revisionism." New England Journal of History 64.1 (2007): 31–48. online
- Yergler, Dennis K. (1993). Herbert Feis, Wilsonian internationalism, and America's technological-democracy. P. Lang. ISBN 9780820420783.
- "Herbert Feis." Dictionary of American Biography, (Charles Scribner's Sons, 1994). online
