= Thrombosis and Haemostasis =

- Discipline: Medicine
- Language: English
- Edited by: Christian Weber, Gregory Y. H. Lip

Publication details
- Publisher: Thieme Medical Publishers
- Frequency: Monthly
- Impact factor: 6.7 (2022)

Standard abbreviations
- ISO 4: Thromb. Haemost.

Indexing
- ISSN: 0340-6245

Links
- Journal homepage; Online access

Thrombosis and Haemostasis is a peer-review scientific journal of medicine. It is published by Thieme Medical Publishers. It is the official journal of several groups and societies: European Society of Cardiology (Thrombosis working group, Atherosclerosis and Vascular Biology working group), Sociedad Española de Trombosis y Hemostasia, Australian Vascular Biology Society, and Gesellschaft für Thrombose- und Hämostaseforschung e.V. A related publication is TH Open. The journal was established in 1957 and is published monthly. The current editors-in-chief are Christian Weber and Gregory Y. H. Lip.

== Abstracting and indexing ==
The journal is abstracted and indexing in the following bibliographic databases:

- BIOSIS Previews
- CNKI Scholar
- Current Contents/Clinical Medicine
- Current Contents/Life Sciences
- EMBASE
- Medline
- ProQuest/SciSearch
- Research Alert
- Science Citation Index
- Science Citation Index Expanded
- SCOPUS
- Web of Science

According to the Journal Citation Reports, the journal has a 2017 impact factor of 4.952.
