= Gregory Lip =

British cardiologist

- Born: June 6, 1964 (age 62)
- Scientific career
- Workplaces: University of Liverpool

Gregory Lip is a clinical researcher and Price-Evans Chair of Cardiovascular Medicine, at the University of Liverpool. He was Director of the Liverpool Centre for Cardiovascular Science at the University of Liverpool, Liverpool John Moores University and Liverpool Heart & Chest Hospital (2019-2026).

He is a NIHR senior investigator, and also distinguished professor at Aalborg University, Denmark; and adjunct professor at Yonsei University and Seoul National University, Seoul, Korea. He also holds visiting or honorary professorships in various other universities in UK, Serbia (Belgrade), S.Korea (Yonsei, Seoul National University), China (Beijing, Nanjing, Guangzhou), Thailand (Chiangmai, Mahidol in Bangkok) and Taiwan (Taipei).

He is one of the top highly-cited researchers (h>100) according to webometrics. and AD Scientific Index Rankings.

Lip has had a major interest into the epidemiology of atrial fibrillation (AF), as well as the pathophysiology of thromboembolism in this arrhythmia. Furthermore, he has been researching stroke and bleeding risk factors, and improvements in clinical risk stratification. The CHA2DS2-VASc and HAS-BLED scores - for assessing stroke and bleeding risk, respectively – were first proposed and independently validated following his research. The ABC (Atrial fibrillation Better Care) pathway management approach proposed by him is the core recommendation in various AF guidelines, and has been shown to reduce adverse outcomes in AF patients. His work has led to changes in national and international clinical practice guidelines and improvements in patient care.

Lip was ranked by Expertscape as a leading expert in the understanding and treatment of AF, a position still maintained in 2023. In 2023, he was awarded the American College of Cardiology (ACC) Distinguished Scientist Award (Clinical Domain).

He was on the writing committee for various international guidelines, including the American College of Chest Physicians (ACCP) Antithrombotic Therapy Guidelines for Atrial Fibrillation, as well as various guidelines and/or position statements from the European Society of Cardiology (ESC) or European Heart Rhythm Association. He has acted as senior/section editor for major international textbooks and at senior editorial level for major international journals.
