= James A. Garfield Memorial =

Mausoleum in Cleveland, Ohio

- U.S. National Register of Historic Places
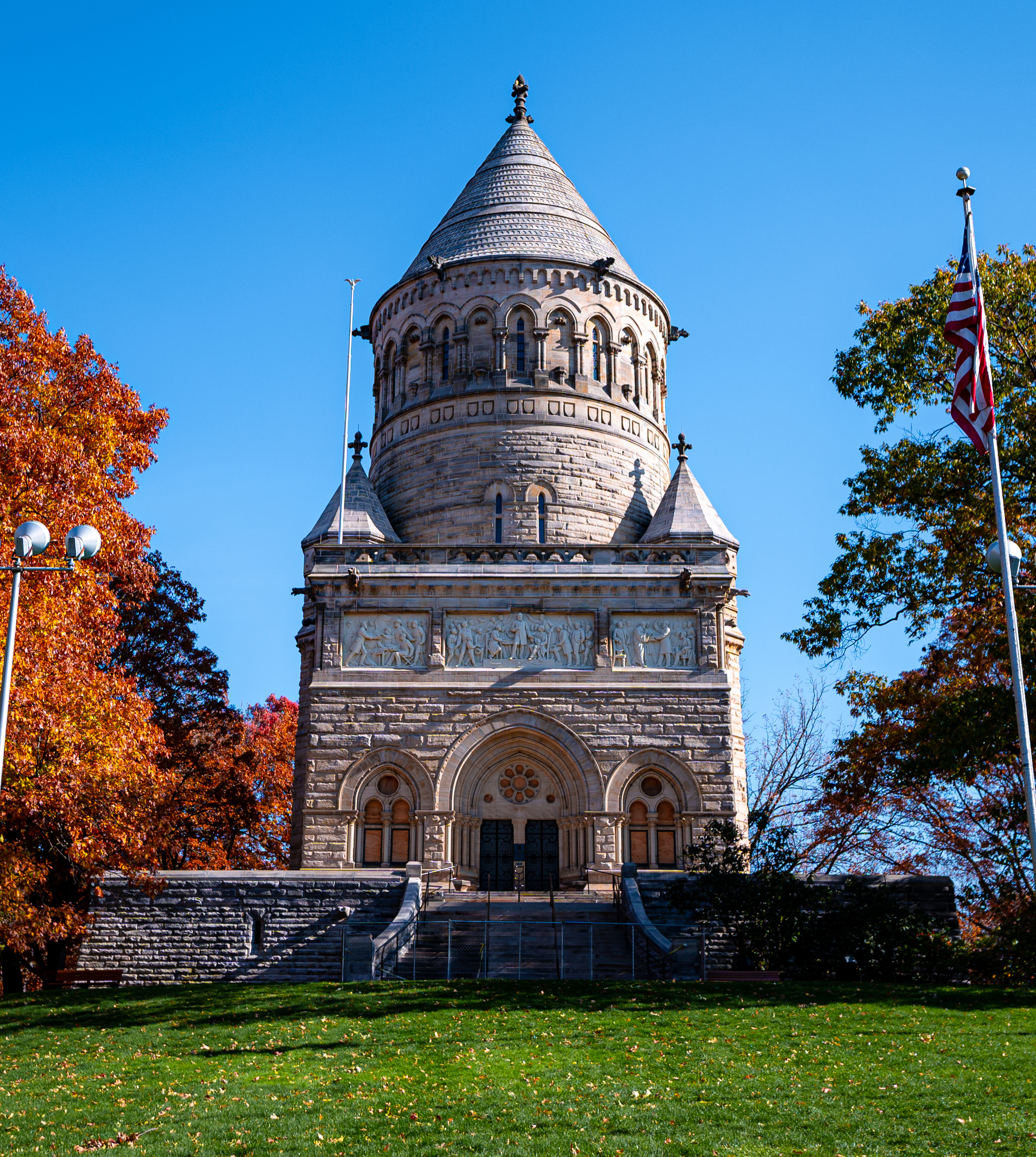
- The James A. Garfield Memorial in 2020

- Location within Cleveland Location within Ohio Location within the United States
- Interactive map showing the location of James A. Garfield Memorial
- Location: 12316 Euclid Ave. in Lake View Cemetery, Cleveland, Ohio
- Coordinates: 41°30′36″N 81°35′29″W
- Area: 0.5 acres (0.20 ha)
- Built: 1890
- Architect: George Keller; Caspar Buberl, sculptor
- Architectural style: Gothic, Romanesque
- NRHP reference No.: 73001411
- Added to NRHP: April 11, 1973

The James A. Garfield Memorial is the final resting place of assassinated President James A. Garfield, located in Lake View Cemetery in Cleveland, Ohio. The memorial, which began construction in October 1885 and was dedicated on May 30, 1890, exhibits a combination of Byzantine, Gothic, and Romanesque Revival architectural styles. Garfield, former First Lady Lucretia Garfield, and two other members of the Garfield family are entombed in the crypt level of the monument.

The monument was added to the National Register of Historic Places in 1973.

== Site selection ==
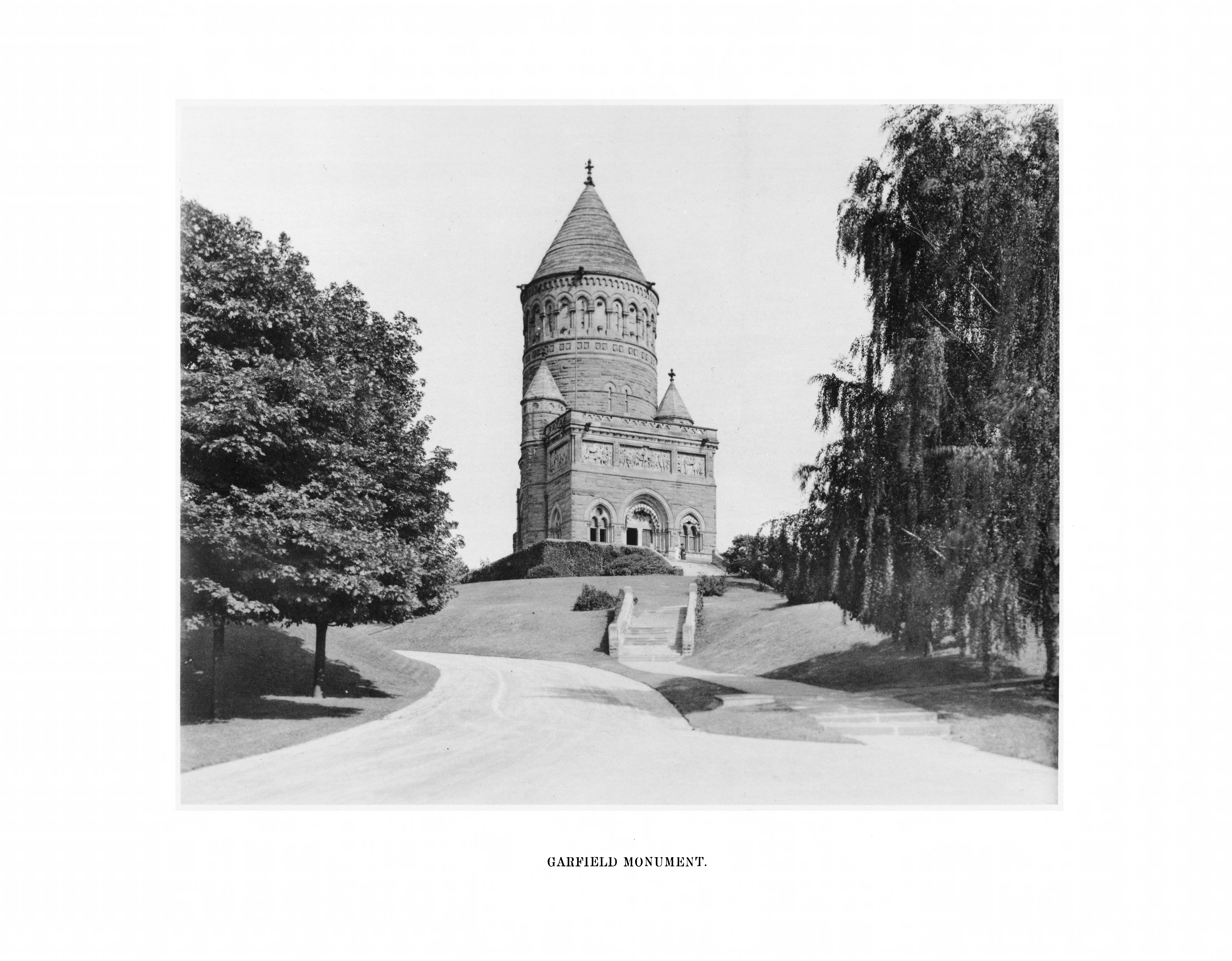
1911

President James A. Garfield, a resident of nearby Mentor, Ohio, was shot in Washington, D.C., on July 2, 1881. He died on September 19, 1881. Garfield himself had expressed the wish to be buried at Lake View Cemetery, and the cemetery offered a burial site free of charge to his widow, Lucretia Garfield. (Note: The land for the memorial was worth $55,000 ($1,800,000 in 2025 dollars).)

Mrs. Garfield agreed to bury her husband at Lake View. Even before Garfield's funeral, plans were laid by his friends and admirers for a grand tomb to be erected at a high point in the cemetery.

The Garfield Memorial Committee selected the highest point in the cemetery in June 1883 for the president's final resting place. Lake View Cemetery built a road around the memorial in early 1885 and began work on cutting a road from the Euclid Gate to the memorial site later that fall. The cemetery also began work on making improvements to the landscape, water, and drainage around the site.

== Design and construction ==
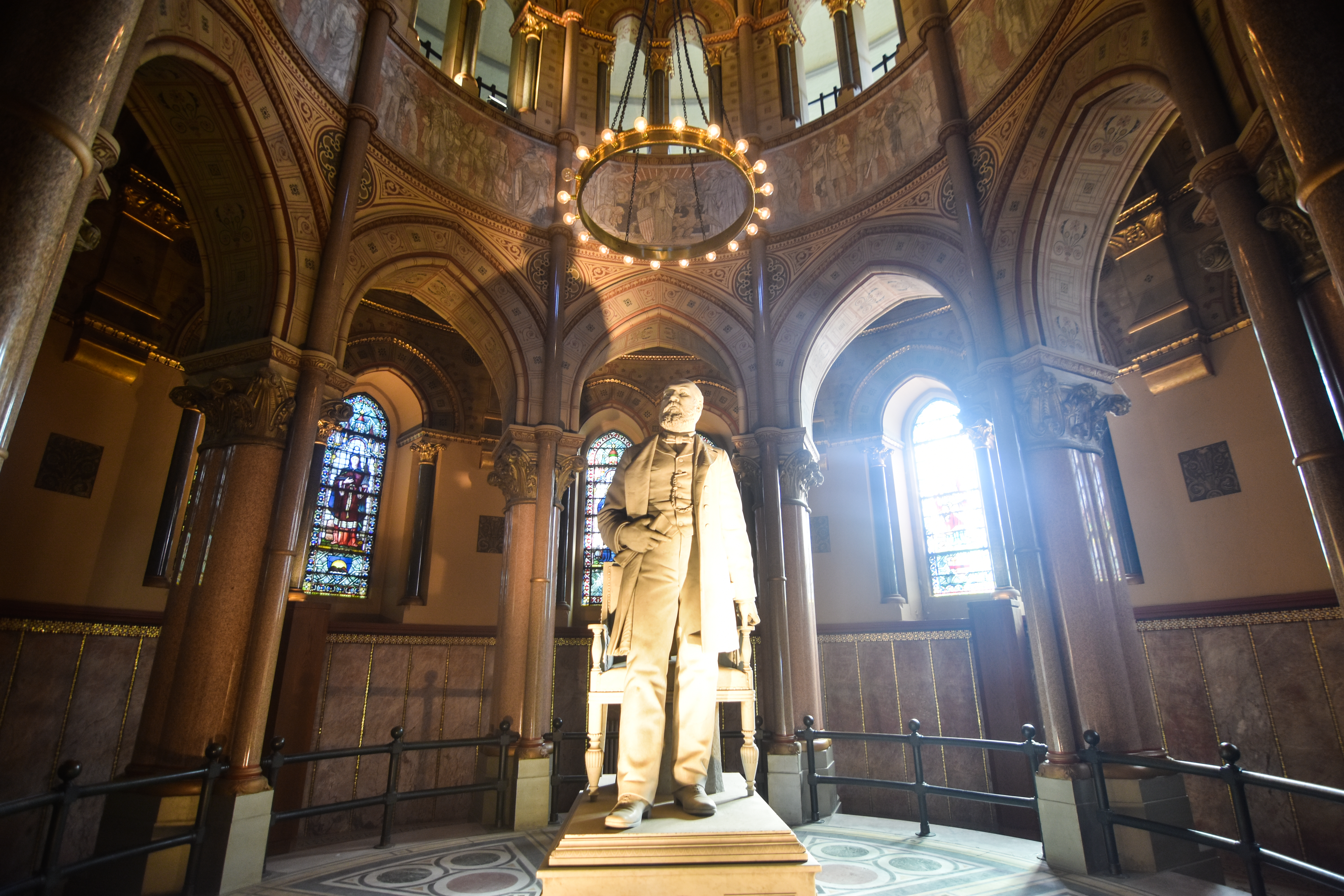
Statue of James A. Garfield by Alexander Doyle inside the memorial

The tomb was designed by architect George Keller in the Byzantine, Gothic, and Romanesque Revival styles. All the stone for the monument came from the quarries of the Cleveland Stone Company, and was quarried locally. The exterior reliefs, which depict scenes from Garfield's life, were done by Caspar Buberl. Its cost, $135,000 ($4,800,000 in 2025 dollars), was funded entirely through private donations. Part of the memorial's funding came from pennies sent in by children throughout the country.

The round tower is 50 feet (15 m) in diameter and 180 feet (55 m) high. Around the exterior of the balcony are five terra cotta panels with over 110 life size figures depicting Garfield's life and death.

The interior features stained glass windows and window like panes representing the original 13 colonies, plus the state of Ohio, along with panels depicting War and Peace; mosaics; deep red granite columns; and a 12-foot (3.7 m)-tall white Carrara marble statue of President Garfield by Alexander Doyle. An observation deck provides views of downtown Cleveland and Lake Erie.

Construction on the memorial began on October 6, 1885, and it was dedicated on May 30, 1890.

The caskets of the President and Lucretia Garfield lie in a crypt on full display beneath the memorial, along with the ashes of their daughter (Mary "Mollie" Garfield Stanley-Brown [1867–1947]) and son-in-law Joseph Stanley Brown. Lucretia Garfield died on March 13, 1918, and was interred in the Garfield Memorial on March 21.

== Operational history ==
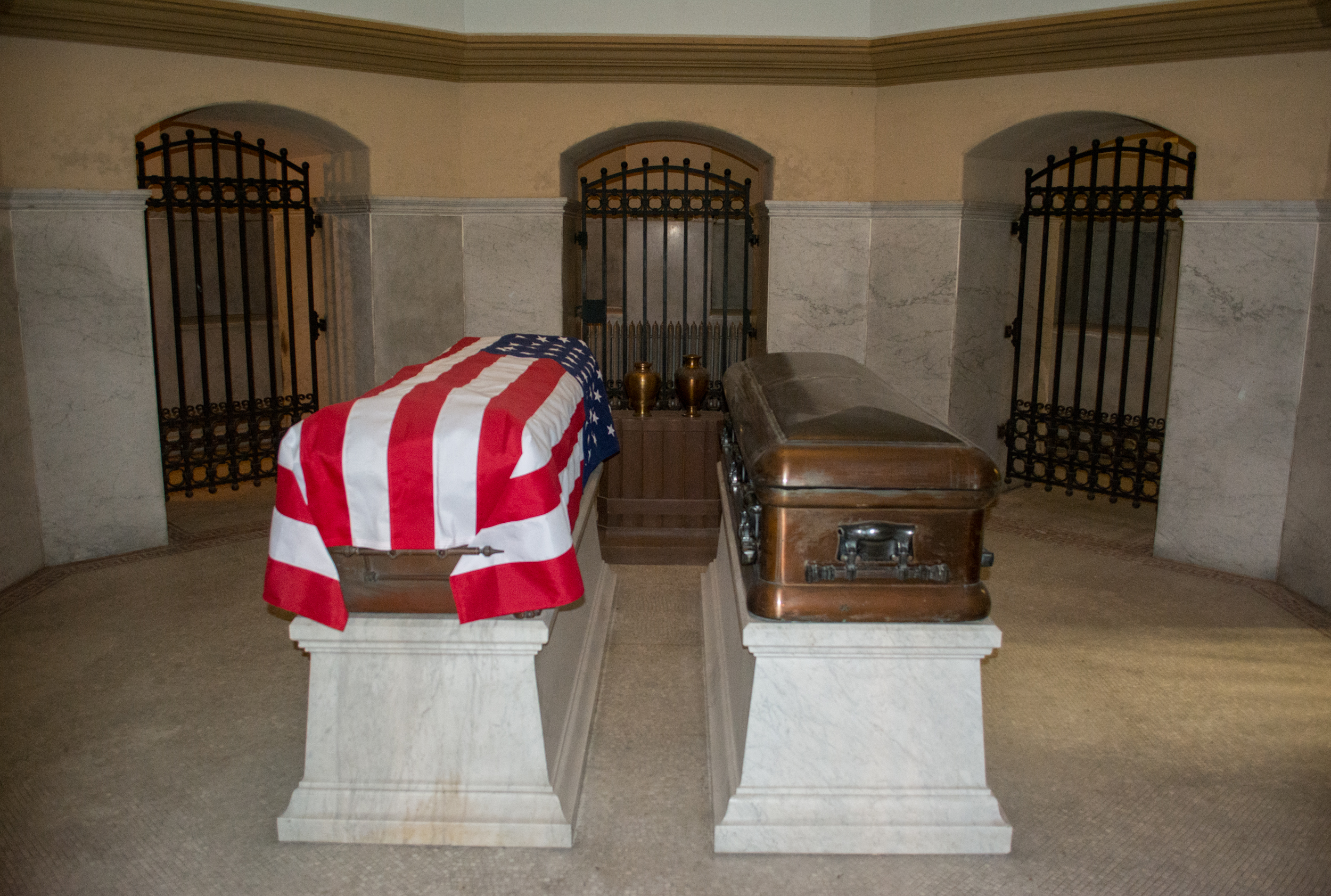
Tomb of James and Lucretia Garfield

Since the Garfield Memorial was private, the committee overseeing its operation charged an entry fee of 10 cents per person to defray its maintenance costs.

In late October 1923, the Garfield National Monument Association turned the Garfield Memorial over to Lake View Cemetery. Most of the Monument Association's members had died, and its charter did not allow for a self-perpetuating board. After accepting title to the memorial and its land, Lake View Cemetery immediately ended the practice of charging a 10 cent ($2 in 2025 dollars) admission fee to the memorial. Lake View also began cleaning, repairing, and rehabilitating the memorial.

Lake View Cemetery spent $5 million in 2016 and 2017 conserving, repairing, and upgrading the memorial's structural elements. This included reinforcing beams and columns in the basement.

In 2019, the cemetery began a multi-million-dollar project to clean the exterior and repoint any damaged or missing mortar. It is the first time in the memorial's history that the exterior has been cleaned.

The memorial closes every winter on November 19 (President Garfield's birthday) and reopens in April.

== See also ==
- National Register of Historic Places listings in Cleveland, Ohio
- Presidential memorials in the United States
- List of burial places of presidents and vice presidents of the United States

== Bibliography ==
- Brown, E. E. (1881). The Life and Public Services of James A. Garfield. Boston: D.L. Guernsey.
- Foster, Ellsworth D.; Hughes, James L. (1922). The American Educator. Vol. 2. Chicago: Ralph Durham Company.
- Lossing, Benson John (1882). A Biography of James A. Garfield. New York: H.S. Goodspeed & Company. ISBN 9780795017575.
- Morton, Marian (2004). Cleveland's Lake View Cemetery. Charleston, S.C.: Arcadia Publishing. ISBN 9780738532301.
- Thayer, William M. (1889). From Log-Cabin to the White House: The Story of President Garfield's Life. London: Hodder and Stoughton.
