= James Rudolph Garfield =

American lawyer and politician (1865–1950)

James Garfield
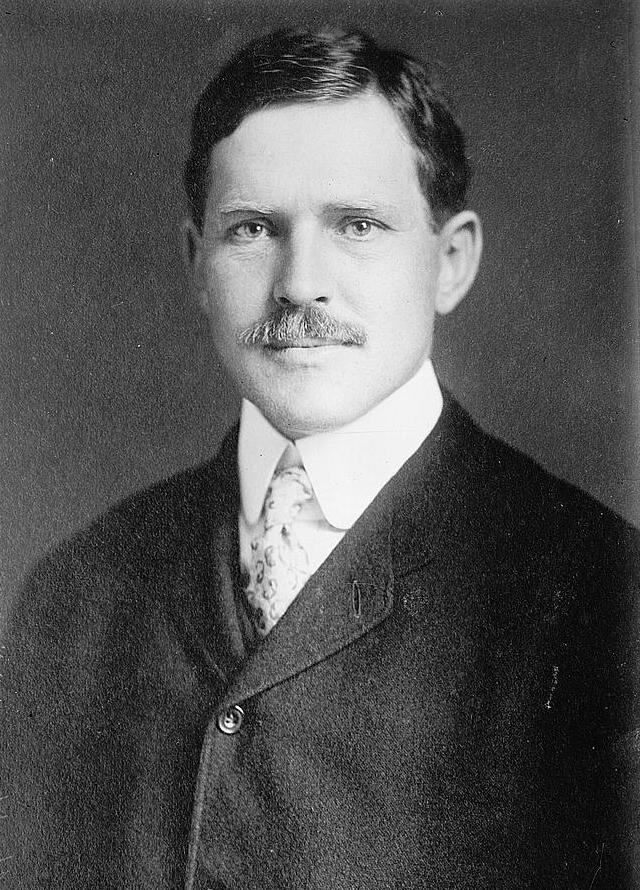

23rd United States Secretary of the Interior
- In office March 5, 1907 – March 4, 1909
- President: Theodore Roosevelt
- Preceded by: Ethan Allen Hitchcock
- Succeeded by: Richard A. Ballinger

Commissioner of the Bureau of Corporations
- In office February 26, 1903 – March 4, 1907
- President: Theodore Roosevelt
- Preceded by: Position established
- Succeeded by: Herbert Knox Smith

Personal details
- Born: James Rudolph Garfield; October 17, 1865 Hiram, Ohio, U.S.
- Died: March 24, 1950 (aged 84) Cleveland, Ohio, U.S.
- Party: Republican
- Other political affiliations: Progressive (Bull Moose)
- Spouse: Helen Newell (m. 1890; died 1930)
- Relations: Harry Augustus Garfield (brother); Abram Garfield (brother); Mollie Garfield (sister)
- Children: 4
- Parents: James A. Garfield (father); Lucretia Garfield (mother)
- Education: Williams College (BA); Columbia University

James Rudolph Garfield (October 17, 1865 – March 24, 1950) was an American lawyer and politician. Garfield was a son of the 20th President of the United States James A. Garfield and First Lady Lucretia Garfield. He served as Secretary of the Interior during President Theodore Roosevelt's administration.

== Early life ==
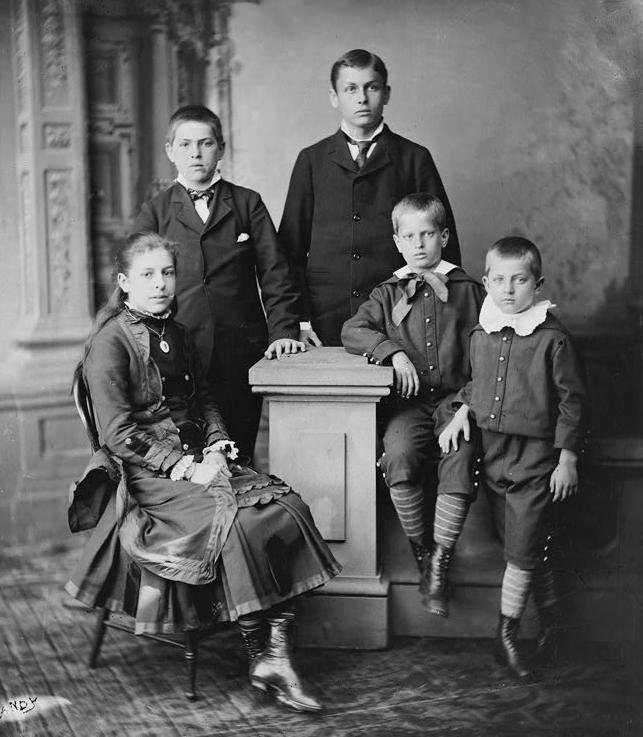
James R. Garfield (first boy from left) and siblings

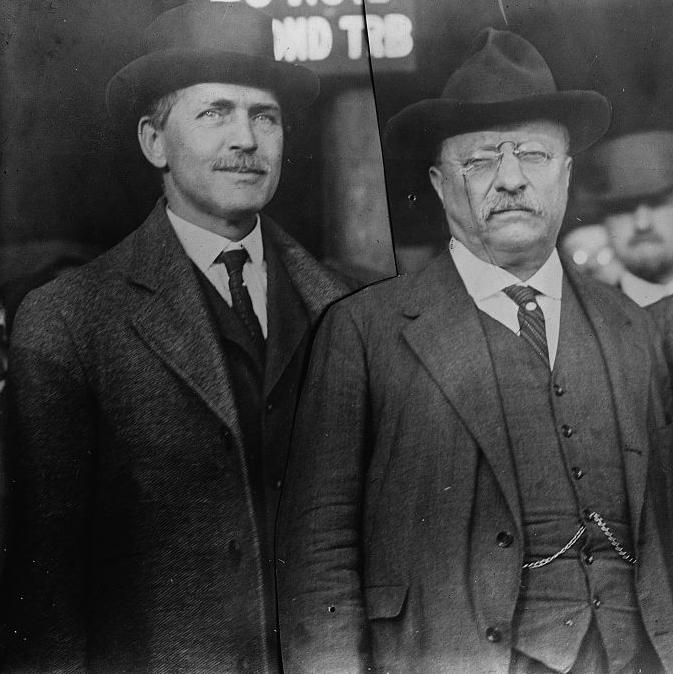
Garfield with Theodore Roosevelt

Garfield was born in Hiram, Ohio, on October 17, 1865, the third of seven children born to James Abram and Lucretia Rudolph Garfield. In 1876 the family moved to what is now the James A. Garfield National Historic Site in Mentor, Ohio. For a year prior to his father's presidency, he studied at St. Paul's School in Concord, New Hampshire.

On July 2, 1881, at the age of 15, he and his 17-year-old brother, Harry Augustus Garfield, witnessed the shooting of their father by disgruntled office-seeker Charles J. Guiteau at the Baltimore and Potomac railroad station in Washington. The President and his sons were waiting for a train en route to Williams College in Williamstown, Massachusetts, where young James had been recently accepted, when the shooting took place. The president died from infections related to his wounds, two months later.

== College and early career ==
Following his father's death on September 19, 1881, Garfield studied at Williams College. He received his A.B. degree in 1885, and then attended Columbia Law School. In 1888, he was admitted to the Ohio bar and established the Cleveland, Ohio-based law firm of Garfield and Garfield, with his brother Harry Augustus Garfield. From 1890 until her death in 1930, he was married to Helen Newell. They had four sons, John, James, Newell, and Rudolph. Their grandson, Newell Garfield, later married Jane Harrison Walker, a granddaughter of President Benjamin Harrison and Harrison's second wife, Mary Dimmick Harrison, as well as the great-grandniece of James G. Blaine.

== Political career ==
From 1896 to 1899, Garfield served in the Ohio State Senate. He was an influential advisor to President Theodore Roosevelt, serving as a Member of the United States Civil Service Commission from April 24, 1902 to February 25, 1903 alongside John Robert Procter and William Dudley Foulke, preceded by William A. Rodenberg and succeeded by Alford Cooley. From 1903 to 1907, he served as Commissioner of Corporations at the Department of Commerce and Labor, where he conducted investigations of the meat-packing, petroleum, steel, and railroad industries. From 1907 to 1909, he served in Roosevelt's Cabinet as Secretary of the Interior, where he advocated for the conservation of natural resources but, notably, approved the request from San Francisco to dam the Hetch Hetchy valley in Yosemite National Park. He left this post on March 4, 1909, and returned to his law practice in Cleveland. In 1909, he received an honorary LL.D. degree from the University of Pittsburgh. Garfield was a contender for the Ohio Republican gubernatorial nomination in the 1910 election but withdrew from the convention when it endorsed the Taft Administration; the convention went on to nominate future president Warren G. Harding in the third round of balloting. During the 1912 presidential election, he was a key supporter of Roosevelt's bid for a third term. In the 1914 election, he made an unsuccessful bid for Governor of Ohio on the Progressive Party ticket.

== World War I ==
Former President Theodore Roosevelt selected Garfield as one of eighteen officers including Seth Bullock, Frederick Russell Burnham, John M. Parker, and Henry L. Stimson to raise a volunteer infantry division, Roosevelt's World War I volunteers, for service in France in 1917. The United States Congress gave Roosevelt the authority to raise up to four divisions similar to the Rough Riders of the 1st United States Volunteer Cavalry Regiment and to the British Army 25th (Frontiersmen) Battalion, Royal Fusiliers; however, as Commander-in-chief, President Woodrow Wilson refused to make use of the volunteers and the unit disbanded.

== Death ==
Garfield died in Cleveland, Ohio, on March 24, 1950, at the age of 84, and was the last surviving member of President Theodore Roosevelt's cabinet. He had survived his father by 68½ years. He was interred in Mentor Municipal Cemetery in Mentor, Ohio, beside his wife Helen.

== See also: ==
- List of children of presidents of the United States

== Notes ==
Political offices
Preceded by Ethan Hitchcock	United States Secretary of the Interior; 1907–1909	Succeeded by Richard Ballinger
