= Lucretia Garfield =

First Lady of the United States in 1881

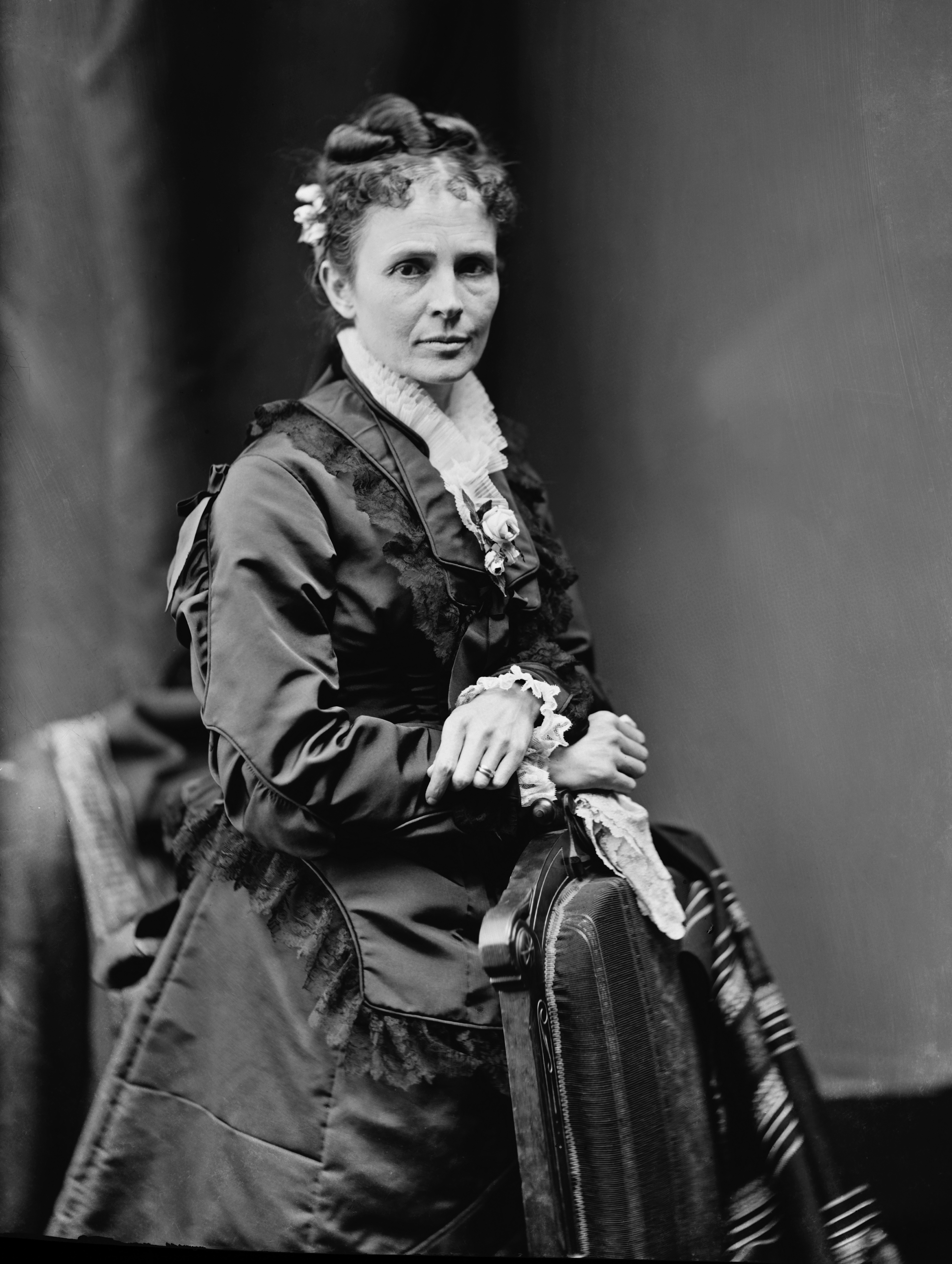
- Portrait, c. 1880

First Lady of the United States
- In role March 4 – September 19, 1881
- President: James A. Garfield
- Preceded by: Lucy Webb Hayes
- Succeeded by: Mary Arthur McElroy (acting)

Personal details
- Born: Lucretia Rudolph; April 19, 1832 Garrettsville, Ohio, U.S.
- Died: March 13, 1918 (aged 85) South Pasadena, California, U.S.
- Resting place: James A. Garfield Memorial
- Spouse: James A. Garfield (m. 1858; died 1881)
- Children: 7, including Hal, James, Mollie and Abram
- Education: Geauga Seminary; Western Reserve Eclectic Institute

Lucretia "Crete" Garfield (née Rudolph; April 19, 1832 – March 13, 1918) was the first lady of the United States from March to September 1881, as the wife of James A. Garfield, the 20th president of the United States.

Born in Garrettsville, Ohio, Garfield first met her husband at Geauga Seminary. After a long courtship, they married in 1858. Their early years were difficult, as James was often away and became romantically involved with other women. They would eventually have seven children together, five of whom lived to adulthood. Highly educated and knowledgeable of Washington politics, Garfield was a regular adviser for her husband, and she assisted him in his front porch campaign for the presidency. She was well regarded during her brief period in the White House, but after only a few months contracted malaria and went to Long Branch, New Jersey, to recuperate.

On July 2, 1881, Garfield's husband was shot; he died from infections related to the wounds two months later, during which time his wife stayed at his bedside and received much public sympathy. Garfield returned to her former residence in Ohio after being widowed, and she spent much of the rest of her life preserving her husband's papers and other materials, establishing what was effectively the first presidential library, before her death in 1918.

== Early life ==
Lucretia "Crete" Rudolph was born in Garrettsville, Ohio, on April 19, 1832. She was the daughter of carpenter Zebulon Rudolph and Arabella Mason Rudolph, the first of four children. She was raised as a member of the Disciples of Christ. Rudolph was often in poor health as a child, suffering from respiratory issues. Spending long periods of time bedridden as a child, she developed a love for reading. Her family was reserved, with very few outward shows of affection.

Rudolph learned household skills from her mother, such as cleaning and cooking, as was common for girls at the time. Her parents also decided to have her receive a formal education, which was less common, and she attended the town's grammar school. She then attended the Geauga Seminary in Chester Township, Ohio, at the same time as James A. Garfield. Her father co-founded the Western Reserve Eclectic Institute (now Hiram College), and she began attending the school in 1850. Here she pursued her interest in literature, starting a literary group and contributing to a school magazine. Garfield attended the school as well, and he also took on a teaching position, becoming one of Rudolph's teachers. Rudolph expressed beliefs that women were capable of their own achievements in society and that they should receive equal pay in employment, though she abandoned these beliefs after leaving college.

Rudolph and Garfield began a personal correspondence in November 1853, and they agreed to marry in early 1854. They began a courtship by letter when Garfield moved away to attend Williams College. Garfield first noticed her for her intelligence, though he discouraged her from overexerting herself in her studies. Rudolph became a teacher, instructing classes in Cleveland and Ravenna, Ohio. The strength of their relationship fluctuated over the following years, as Garfield lamented Rudolph's reserved demeanor. At one point, Garfield began a relationship with another woman, Rebecca Selleck, while he attended Williams College. Only after returning home and being allowed to read Rudolph's diary did Garfield realize the extent of her commitment.

== Marriage and family ==
=== "Years of darkness" ===
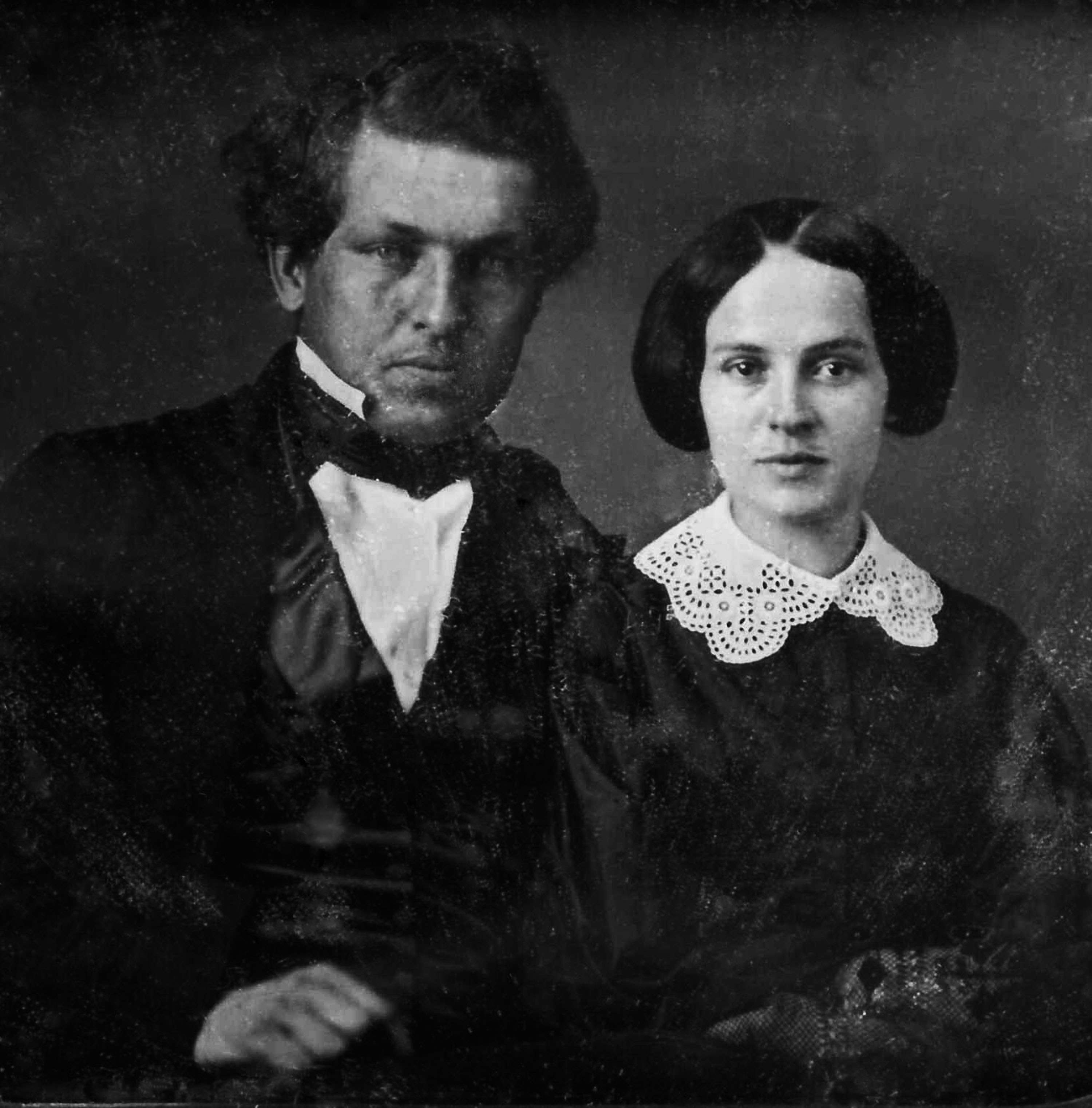
James A. Garfield and Lucretia Rudolph during their engagement

Lucretia Rudolph and James Garfield married at Rudolph's home on November 11, 1858. Both had serious doubts about the wedding in the time leading up to their marriage, as they both felt that they had to marry because they were expected to do so, and Rudolph was worried that she would lose any independence that she had obtained with a career. They did not have a honeymoon after their marriage, instead moving straight into a boarding house.

Lucretia Garfield's life did not change significantly in the years after her marriage, during which she continued working as a teacher. Her husband was rarely home, away as a preacher, as a state legislator, and then as an officer in the Union Army during the American Civil War. In these first five years, they spent no more than 20 weeks together, and James openly expressed regret and contempt for their marriage. Lucretia kept living her life independently, maintaining her own social life and traveling without her husband. She was hurt by the lack of attention he showed her, particularly after the birth of their first child, Eliza, in 1860. When James went to war in 1861, Lucretia returned to her parents' home. They later described this period of their lives as their "years of darkness".

The Garfields did not develop a close relationship until James returned home from the Civil War, on leave after falling seriously ill with jaundice and dysentery. They moved to a farmhouse in Howland Springs, Ohio, where he could recover. This was the first home that they had to themselves, and historians have described this period as a belated honeymoon. It was short lived, as he was called back to war the following month after he had recovered. His return to the military marked an end to this improvement in their relationship, and they were again distant from one another. James pursued other women while away, again expressing interest in Selleck as well as Kate Chase. Lucretia had her second child, Harry, in 1863. Two months later, their firstborn died of diphtheria. This sudden death strengthened their relationship further as they shared their grief.

=== Congressional wife ===
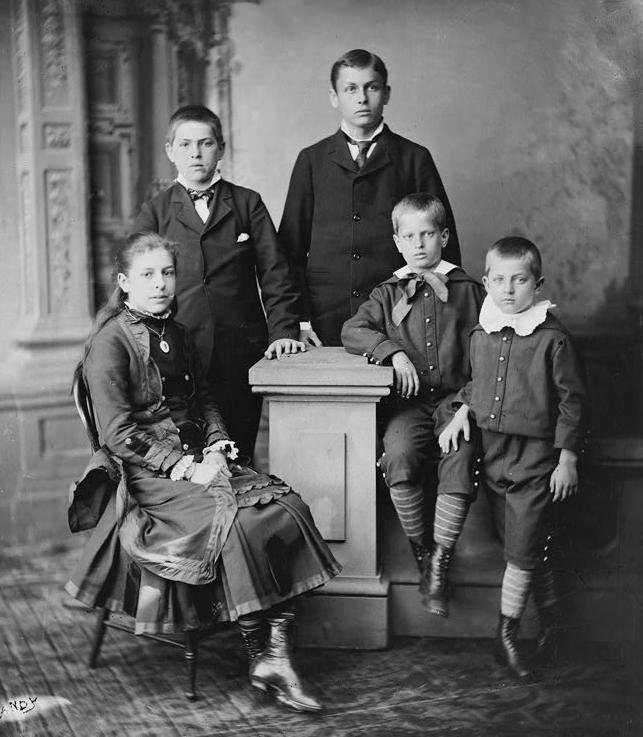
The Garfield children

Shortly after their daughter's death, James moved to Washington, D.C., as he had been elected to the United States House of Representatives. Lucretia remained in Ohio, where she again felt lonely as her husband was away. While James was away, he engaged in romantic intimacy with Lucia Calhoun, an editorial writer. He told Lucretia about the relationship, though its exact nature is unknown; James traveled to New York at Lucretia's request to retrieve and destroy compromising letters. The Garfields determined that they had to fix their marriage, and their relationship began to improve. Lucretia began visiting her husband in Washington in early 1864. She had two more children during this time: her third child, James, was born in 1865 while she stayed in Washington, and she had her fourth child, Mary, in 1867.

The Garfields often traveled to New Jersey each summer, and they took a vacation to Europe in 1867. In 1869, the family decided to relocate to Washington permanently, and they built a home in the capital. It was the first home that they owned themselves, and it was the first time that Lucretia and James lived together for an extended period of time. She had three more children while living there: Irvin in 1870, Abram in 1872, and Edward in 1874. Also among their household were servants, governesses, and James's mother. Their youngest son died in 1876. The same year, they purchased a farm in Ohio so they had a home of their own that they could live in each summer. Lucretia agreed with the belief that women should live domestic lives, though she also resented the idea. She did not play a direct role in her husband's Congressional career, hosting and attending very few Washington social events. Instead, she offered him advice, and she visited the United States Capitol to watch him speak in the House.

=== 1880 presidential election ===
Lucretia Garfield was dismayed when her husband was only raised as a compromise presidential candidate during the 1880 Republican National Convention; she wished that he would be nominated because he was the most popular choice. Over the following months, they held a front porch campaign in which countless voters visited the Garfield home to meet the candidate. She only learned that he was successfully nominated when the first visitors arrived with the news. Lucretia became the first spouse of a presidential candidate to appear on a campaign poster, though she only allowed the one photo to be taken of her for the campaign. James was elected president in the 1880 presidential election.

During the interim period in which James was president-elect, Lucretia became his closest adviser. When he was choosing members of his presidential cabinet, she insisted on the inclusion of James G. Blaine, whom she admired, while she rejected Thaddeus C. Pound because his wife had once been involved in a scandal. She also urged her husband not to trust the Stalwart faction of his party, insisting that he "fight them dead". Her distrust of the Stalwarts came not only from Blaine's warnings about them, but also the fact that Stalwart leader Roscoe Conkling, like her husband, had been romantically involved with Kate Chase. Leading up to the inauguration, Garfield traveled to New York under an alias to shop for a dress, and the Garfields arrived in Washington on March 1, 1881.

== First Lady of the United States ==
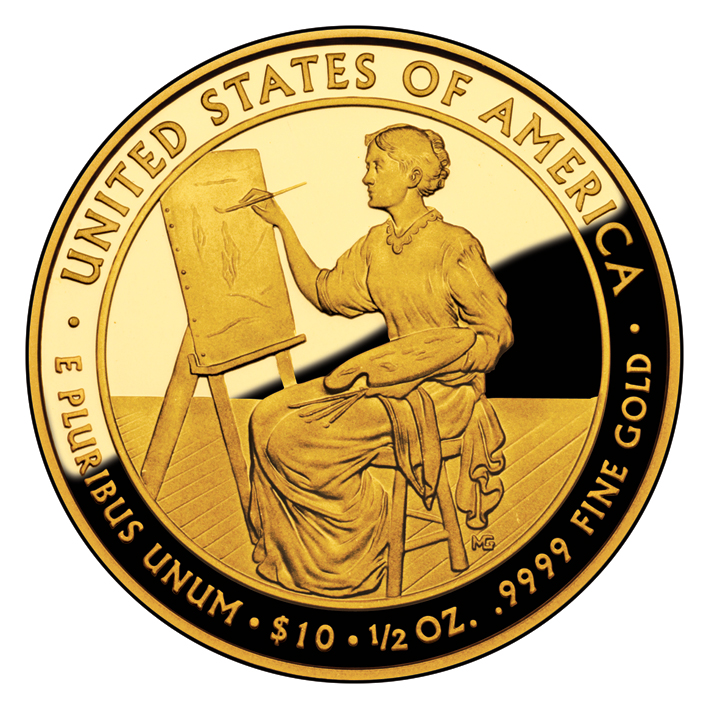
Garfield portrayed on the reverse of the 2011 First Spouse ten-dollar coin

=== White House hostess ===
Garfield became first lady on March 4, 1881, after her husband was inaugurated as President of the United States. Her hosting responsibilities as first lady went far beyond those that were expected of her when she was a Congressional wife, and she sought advice from Blaine's wife, Harriet. Her interest was in the opportunity to meet prominent writers and artists, and she entered the White House with a list of names she wished to invite. Garfield paid more attention to political aspects of the role than the social aspects, and the president kept her updated on happenings in Washington that were not known to the public. Though she believed in gender equality, she rejected the women's suffrage movement, feeling that women had yet to embrace education, which she believed was necessary before equality could be achieved.

Unlike her predecessor, Lucy Webb Hayes, Garfield did not have strong opinions about the temperance movement, and she resumed the serving of alcohol at White House events. This was a decision of some political consequence, as the temperance movement was a predominantly Republican voting bloc, but the banning of alcohol displeased prominent Washington figures and foreign diplomats. She dismissed the temperance advocates lobbying her to reinstate the ban, determining that alcohol in the White House was a small aspect of temperance receiving disproportionate attention.

As her tenure began, Garfield took on the responsibility of refurbishing the White House and lobbying Congress for funding to this end. She took particular interest in White House history, and she often visited the Library of Congress to research the building. Garfield participated in only one interview while she was first lady, in which she freely spoke about politics and her support for Blaine.

=== Assassination of James A. Garfield ===
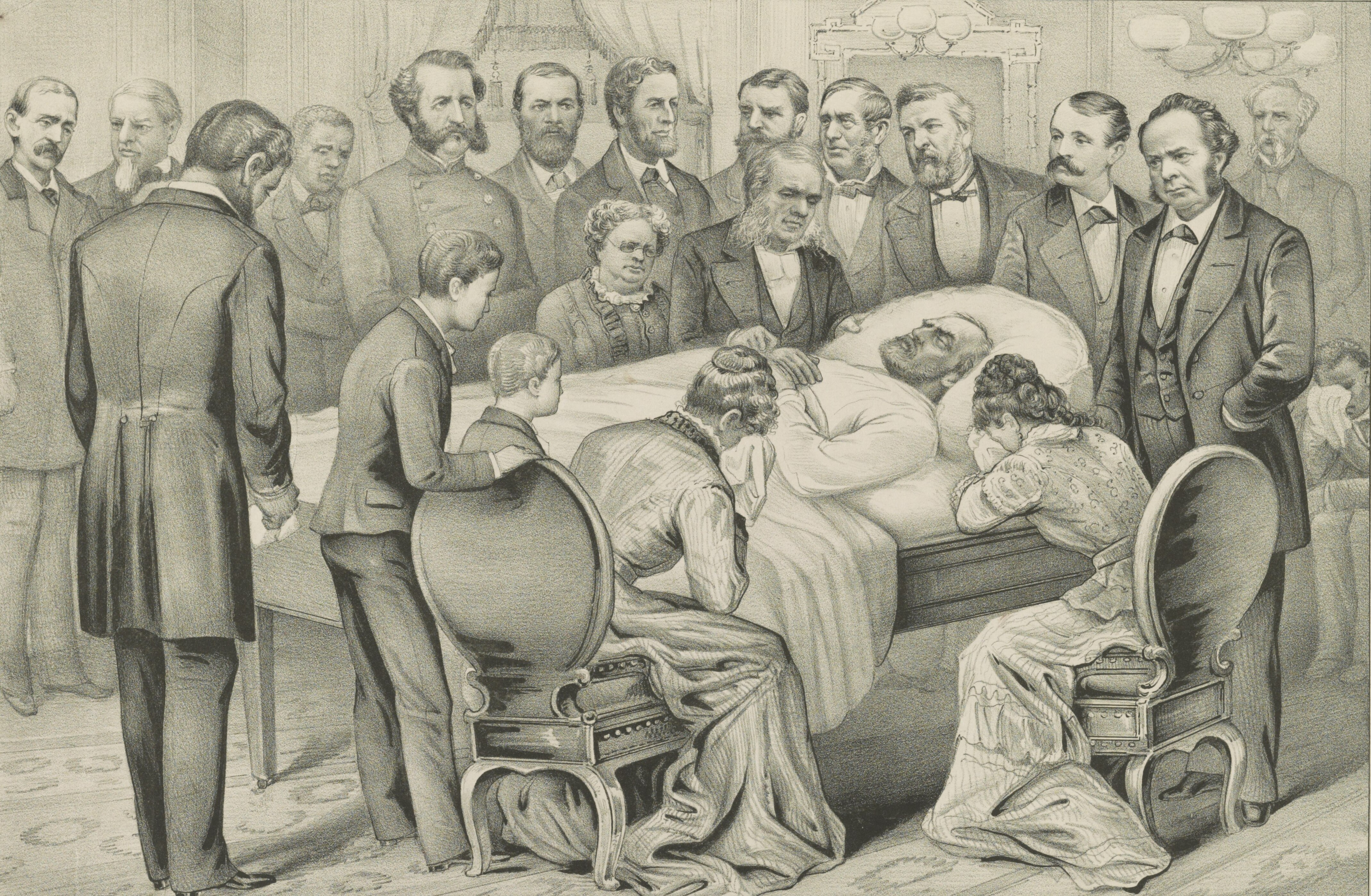
A depiction of Garfield at her husband's deathbed

Only two months into her tenure as first lady, Garfield was afflicted with a life-threatening case of malaria. The president suspended many of his duties so that he could personally tend to her. Her health began to return by June, and her husband rented a cottage in Long Branch, New Jersey, for her to live in while she recuperated. Charles J. Guiteau waited to intercept them with the intention of shooting the president, but the sight of Lucretia, still visibly ill, caused him to hesitate. Weeks later, on July 2, Guiteau shot the president. The wounds were not immediately lethal, and James sent David G. Swaim to inform Lucretia. A train was arranged to take her directly to Washington so she could see her injured husband.

Over the following months, Lucretia stayed by James's bed as his injuries became infected and his health deteriorated. She insisted that her own personal physician, Susan Ann Edson, one of the country's first female physicians, was among those treating the president. Garfield's anguish while sitting at her husband's deathbed earned her widespread sympathy and admiration from the public. The president died on September 19, 1881, two months shy of his 50th birthday.

== Later life and death ==
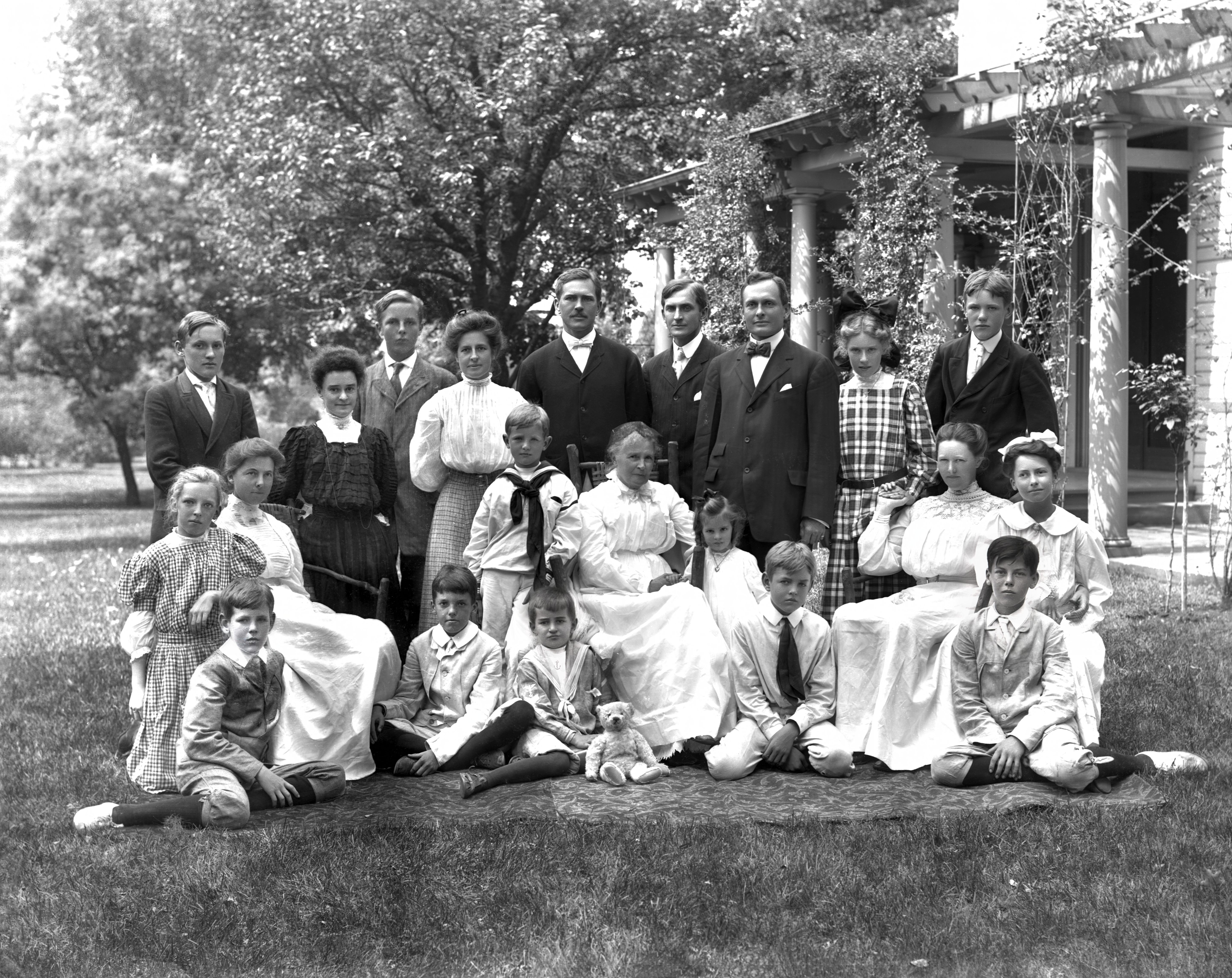
Garfield (center, seated) surrounded by her children and grandchildren, 1906

Garfield organized her husband's public funeral and the creation of his tomb in Lake View Cemetery. She was financially secure as a widow. In addition to an annual $5,000 pension granted by Congress (equivalent to $166,810 in 2025), Cyrus W. Field saw to the creation of a donation drive for her and her children that accumulated a large sum of money. (Note: The sum has alternatively been reported as $300,000 (equivalent to $10,008,621 in 2025) or $360,000 (equivalent to $12,010,345 in 2025).) Despite this wealth, she continued to live economically.

Over the following years, Garfield worked to preserve records of her husband's presidency and his legacy. She worked with historian Theodore Clarke Smith to organize her husband's papers and to document her own memories of the presidency. In 1885, she oversaw the construction of a library on her Ohio property to house all of her husband's books and presidential documents. This came to be recognized as the first presidential library.

In her old age, Garfield found a winter home in South Pasadena, California. She became a prominent member of the community, and she attended the first Rose Parade. When World War I began, she carried out volunteer work each day with the Pasadena Red Cross war committee. When Theodore Roosevelt became president, Garfield became a supporter of his progressivism. In 1916, she supported Democrat Woodrow Wilson for president. Garfield died of pneumonia at her winter home in South Pasadena, on March 13, 1918, and was buried with her husband in Lake View Cemetery.

== Legacy ==
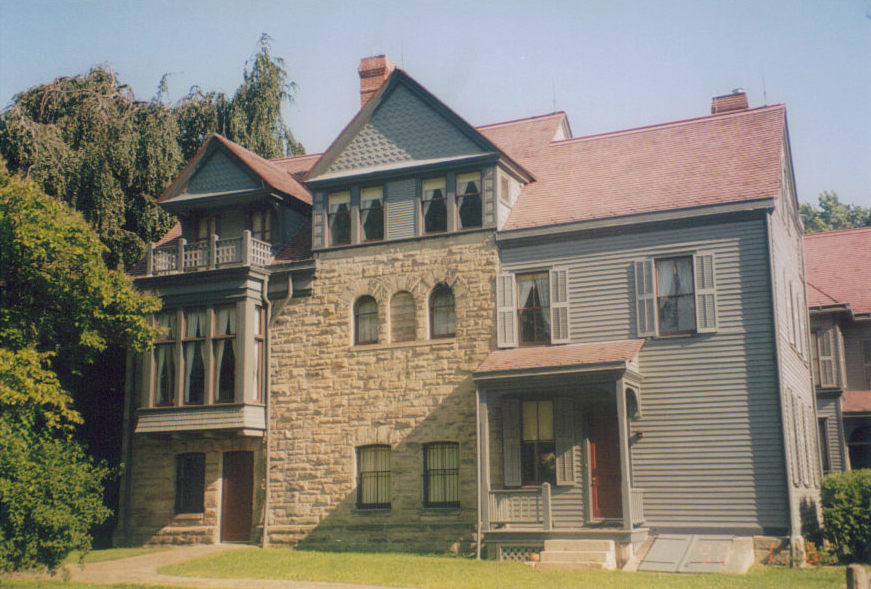
The back of the Garfields' home at the James A. Garfield National Historic Site in Mentor, Ohio

Garfield had one of the shortest tenures of any first lady, second only to Anna Harrison. Despite this short tenure, she has received more attention from historians than her predecessor, Lucy Hayes. This short tenure precluded any direct influence that she may have had on the position, but her practice of preserving her husband's documents in a library was adopted by other first ladies, such as Edith Wilson and Nancy Reagan. Garfield's own papers are kept in the Library of Congress. She was only the second of the first ladies to receive higher education.

=== Historical assessments ===
Since 1982 Siena College Research Institute has periodically conducted surveys asking historians to assess American first ladies according to a cumulative score on the independent criteria of their background, value to the country, intelligence, courage, accomplishments, integrity, leadership, being their own women, public image, and value to the president. In terms of cumulative assessment, Garfield has been ranked:

- 30th-best of 42 in 1982
- 28th-best of 37 in 1993
- 30th-best of 38 in 2003
- 27th-best of 38 in 2008
- 28th-best of 38 in 2014
- 27th-best of 40 in 2020

=== Portrayals ===
Garfield has been portrayed by:

- Maria Cuadra (1969) The Price of Power
- Kathryn Erbe (2016) Murder of a President; PBS documentary American Experience
- Betty Gilpin (2025) Death by Lightning; Netflix miniseries

== Notes ==
Honorary titles
Preceded by Lucy Hayes	First Lady of the United States; 1881	Succeeded by Mary McElroy; Acting
