= Joseph Stanley-Brown =

American aide to James A. Garfield (1858–1941)

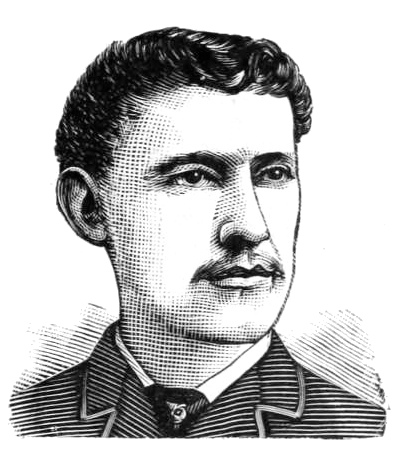

Private Secretary to the President
- In office March 4, 1881 – September 19, 1881
- President: James Garfield
- Preceded by: Webb Hayes
- Succeeded by: Fred J. Phillips

Personal details
- Born: February 3, 1858 Washington, D.C., U.S.
- Died: May 17, 1941 (aged 83) Pasadena, California, U.S.
- Resting place: James A. Garfield Memorial
- Spouse: Mollie Garfield
- Children: 3, including Margaret Stanley-Brown
- Occupation: Geologist, Secretary to the President of the United States
- Known for: Serving as secretary to James Garfield, helping with the USGS

Joseph Stanley-Brown (February 3, 1858 – May 17, 1941) was an American geologist and banker who served as private secretary to the twentieth President of the United States, James A. Garfield. He would completely devote himself to Garfield, as seen when Garfield asked "What can I do for you?" at their first meeting, prompting Brown to respond, "It's not what you can do for me, but what I can do for you, sir." Brown served as Garfield's secretary during his brief presidency, controlling the office-seekers that ran rampant due to the spoils system, which Garfield's vice president Chester Arthur eventually reformed. He married President Garfield's daughter Mary "Mollie" Garfield in 1888.

Brown was born in Washington, D.C. and attended Washington, D.C. public schools where he learned shorthand and typing. He went to the Sheffield Scientific School at Yale University and studied geology. Brown served as a stenographer for John Wesley Powell, the founder of the United States Geological Survey. He also was editor of the Bulletin of the Geological Society of America for 40 years.

Brown was also involved in the banking and railroad businesses. He died in Pasadena, California, and his remains were placed along with his wife's in Garfield's tomb.
