= The American Journal of Surgery =

Scientific journal

- Discipline: Surgery
- Language: English

Publication details
- History: 1926-present
- Publisher: Elsevier (United States)
- Frequency: Monthly
- Impact factor: 2.403 (2015)

Standard abbreviations
- ISO 4: Am. J. Surg.

Indexing
- ISSN: 0002-9610 (print); 1879-1883 (web)
- OCLC no.: 01480194

Links
- Journal homepage

The American Journal of Surgery is a peer-reviewed scientific journal published by Elsevier on behalf of 6 major surgical societies:

- The Southwestern Surgical Congress
- The North Pacific Surgical Association
- The Association for Surgical Education
- Association of Women Surgeons
- Midwest Surgical Association
- The Society of Black Academic Surgeons (SBAS)

Elsevier's former sister company Cahners Publishing acquired The American Journal of Surgery's publisher Technical Publishing in 1986.

The journal publishes articles describing original research on abdominal, cancer, vascular, head and neck, breast, and colorectal surgeries.

According to Journal Citation Reports, the journal has a 2015 impact factor of 2.403. The journal's editor in chief is Kirby I. Bland of the University of Alabama.

== In public media ==
This journal is in Robin Cook's Coma (1978) book.
