= List of memorials to James A. Garfield =

This is a list of memorials to James A. Garfield, the 20th president of the United States.

== Artworks ==
- James Garfield Memorial in Philadelphia, Pennsylvania
- James A. Garfield Monument in Washington, D.C.
- Statue of James A. Garfield (Cincinnati)
- Statue of James A. Garfield (U.S. Capitol)

== Buildings ==
- Garfield Building in Cleveland, Ohio
- James A. Garfield Memorial in Cleveland, Ohio, the final resting place of President and Lucretia Garfield

== Cities, towns, or villages ==
- Garfield, Jefferson County, Idaho
- Garfield, Illinois
- Garfield, Indiana
- Garfield, Kansas
- Garfield, Kentucky
- Garfield, Minnesota
- Garfield, Missouri
- Garfield, New Jersey
- Garfield, Mahoning County, Ohio
- Garfield (Pittsburgh), Pennsylvania
- Garfield, Virginia, a former post office and locale in Springfield, Virginia
- Garfield, Washington

== Counties ==
- Garfield County, Colorado
- Garfield County, Montana
- Garfield County, Nebraska
- Garfield County, Oklahoma
- Garfield County, Utah
- Garfield County, Washington

== Educational institutions ==
- James A. Garfield High School in East Los Angeles, California
- James A. Garfield High School in Akron, Ohio
- James A. Garfield High School in Garrettsville, Ohio
- James A. Garfield High School in Seattle, Washington

== Topographical features ==
- Garfield Creek in Garfield, Victoria, Australia
- Garfield Lake in Hubbard County, Minnesota
- Garfield Mountain in King County, Washington

== Parks and public spaces ==
- Garfield Park in Chicago, Illinois
- Garfield Park in Indianapolis, Indiana
- Garfield Park in Washington, D.C.

== Other ==
- James A. Garfield, a three-masted bark

== See also ==
- Presidential memorials in the United States
