= James Memorial =

James Memorial may refer to the following:

== Awards ==
- Eddie James Memorial Trophy
- James Gatschene Memorial Trophy
- James Norris Memorial Trophy
- James Norris Memorial Trophy (IHL)
- James Tait Black Memorial Prize

== Buildings and structures ==
- Captain James Cook Memorial in Canberra, ACT, Australia
- James Blackstone Memorial Library in Branford, Connecticut
- James Buchanan Memorial in Washington, D.C.
- James Cardinal Gibbons Memorial Statue in Washington, D.C.
- James A. Garfield Memorial in Cleveland, Ohio
- James A. Garfield Monument in Washington, D.C.
- James Garfield Memorial, Philadelphia
- James J. and Helen Storrow Memorial in Boston, Massachusetts
- James Madison Memorial Building in Washington, D.C.
- James Madison Memorial High School in Madison, Wisconsin
- James Memorial Library in Williston, North Dakota
- James M. Hill Memorial High School in Miramichi, New Brunswick, Canada
- James Sangster Memorial in Ipswich, Queensland, Australia
- James Scott Memorial Fountain in Detroit, Michigan
- St. James Memorial Chapel (Howe, Indiana)

== Events ==
- Dr. James Penny Memorial Stakes
- Rowe Memorial Handicap, originally called the James Rowe Memorial

== Organizations ==
- James Madison Memorial Fellowship Foundation

== See also ==
- List of memorials to James A. Garfield
- List of memorials to James Madison
- List of memorials to James Monroe
- List of memorials to James K. Polk
