= Garfield Monument =

Garfield Monument may refer to:

- Garfield Memorial in Cleveland, Ohio
- James A. Garfield Monument in Washington, D.C.
