= Charles Henry Niehaus =

American sculptor (1855–1935)

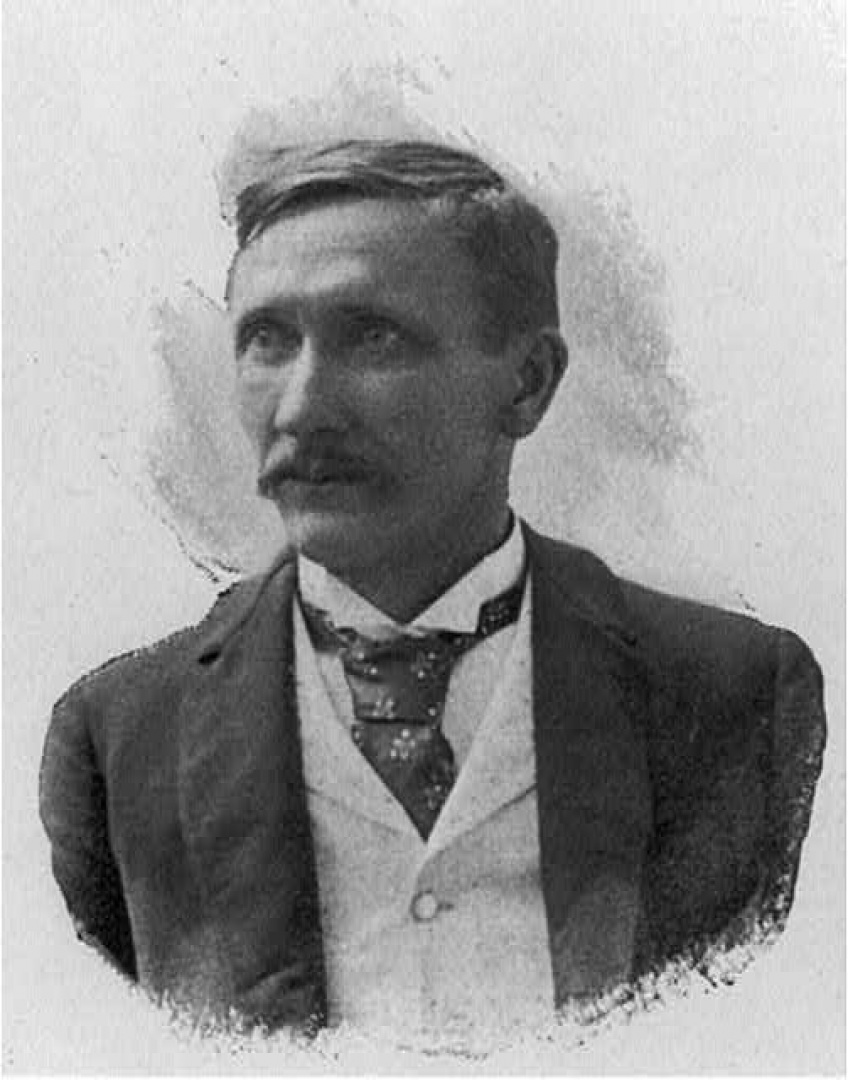
- Niehaus in 1896
- Born: January 24, 1855; Cincinnati, Ohio, U.S.
- Died: June 19, 1935 (aged 80); Cliffside Park, New Jersey, U.S.
- Education: Royal Academy of Fine Arts
- Known for: Sculpture
- Notable work: James A. Garfield (1887), Dr. Samuel Hahnemann (1900), Apotheosis of St. Louis (1906), Orpheus with the Awkward Foot (1922)
- Style: Neoclassical
- Spouse: Regina Armstrong (m. 1900)

Charles Henry Niehaus (January 24, 1855 – June 19, 1935) was an American sculptor.

== Early life and education ==
Niehaus was born in Cincinnati, Ohio, to German parents. He began working as a marble and wood carver, and then gained entrance to the McMicken School of Design in Cincinnati. He studied at the Royal Academy in Munich, Germany (1877–1881). The effect of the German study was that he retained much of the Neo-Classical flavor in his art while most other sculptors of his generation were drawn towards Beaux-Arts realism.

== Career ==
He returned to America in 1881. By virtue of being a native Ohioan, he was commissioned to sculpt two statues of the recently assassinated President James Garfield; one for Cincinnati, and the other, in another pose, for the National Statuary Hall Collection at the United States Capitol. He moved to Rome, Italy, where he worked on the commissions, and made a study of ancient sculpture. He modeled three major male nudes during his years in Rome, including The Scraper (1883) and Caestus (1883-1885). He returned to New York City in 1885, and opened a studio.

In 1887, he created a statue of Ohioan William Allen, also for Statuary Hall. In later years, he was to place statues of Oliver P. Morton of Indiana (1900), John J. Ingalls of Kansas (1905), Zachariah Chandler of Michigan (1913), George W. Glick of Kansas (1914), Ephraim McDowell of Kentucky (1929), and Henry Clay of Kentucky (1929) in the collection. His work was also part of the sculpture event in the art competition at the 1932 Summer Olympics.

Monuments by Niehaus can be found in many American cities. Several of the works authored by him are equestrian statues. As was the case with other sculptors of his day he also fashioned a fair amount of architectural sculpture.

In 1900 Niehaus married noted horticulturalist Regina Armstrong and moved to New Rochelle, New York.

A resident of Cliffside Park, New Jersey, Niehaus died at his home there on June 19, 1935.

== Selected works ==
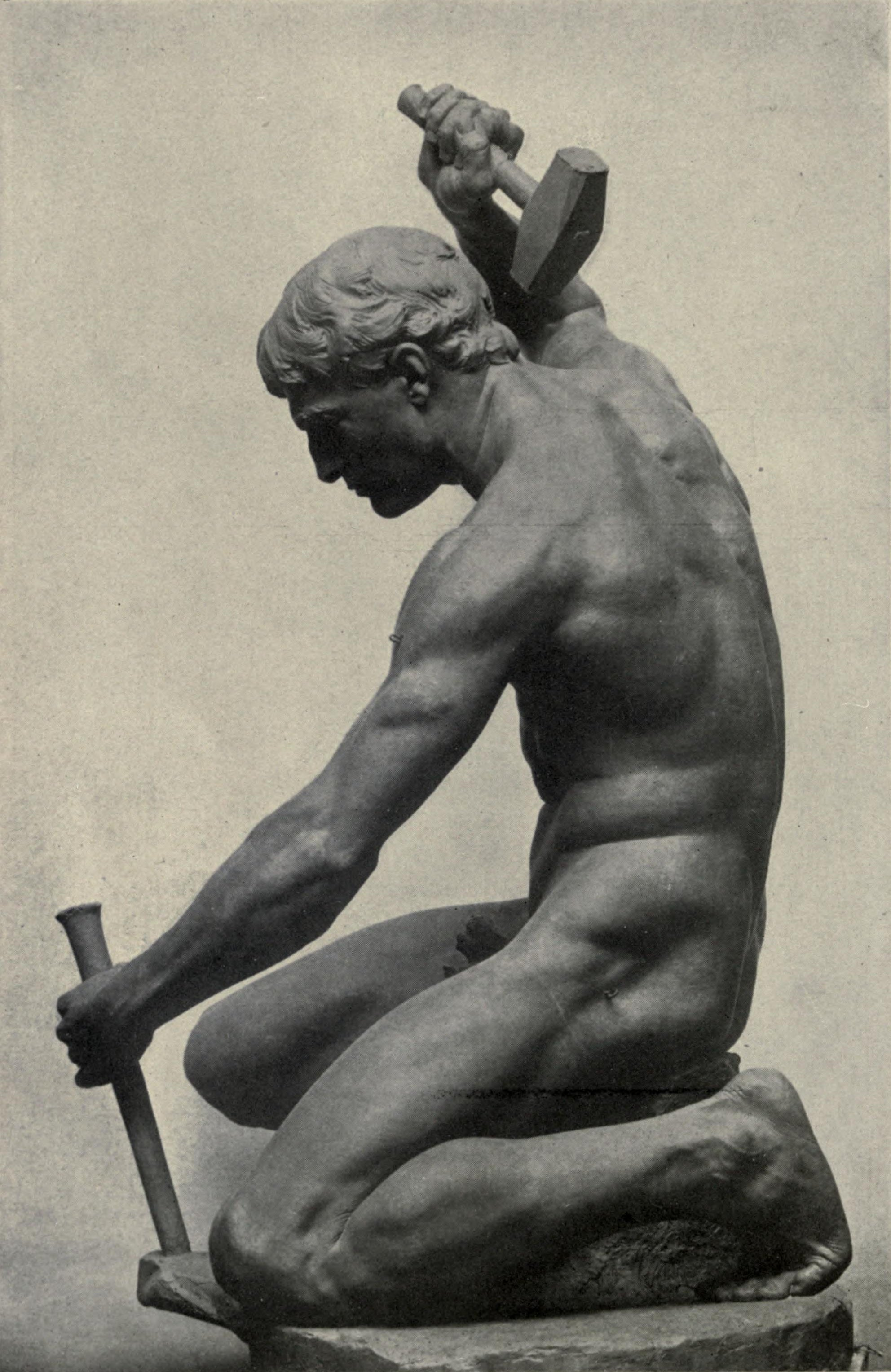
The Driller (1901), Edwin Drake Memorial, Titusville, Pennsylvania

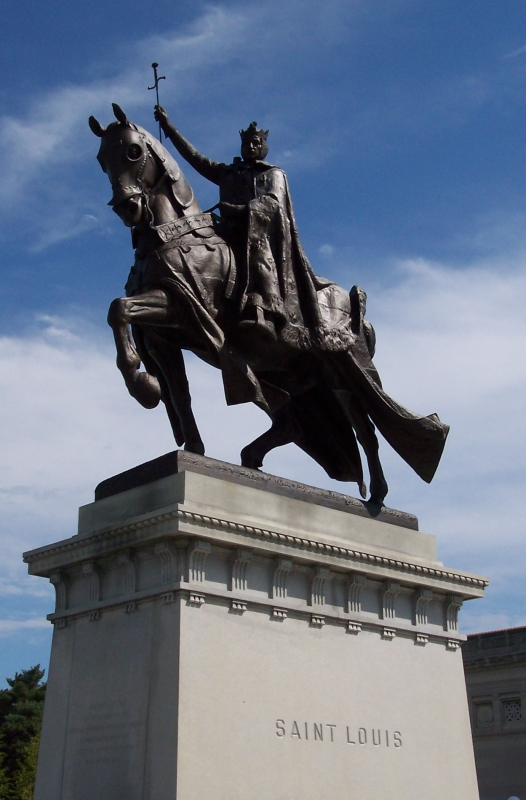
Apotheosis of St. Louis (1906), Forest Park, St. Louis, Missouri

- James A. Garfield, Piatt Park, Cincinnati, Ohio, 1882-1887
- The Scraper (Athlete Using a Strigil), Brookgreen Gardens, Murrells Inlet, South Carolina, 1883
- Caestus, Metropolitan Museum of Art, New York City, 1883-1885
- Bas-relief panel of Surrender of the Hessians, Trenton Battle Monument, Trenton, New Jersey, 1891–1893 William Rudolf O'Donovan sculpted the colossal George Washington statue atop the monument, and statues of two Continental soldiers flanking the entrance. Thomas Eakins modeled two other bas-relief panels.
- Moses, Main Reading Room, Library of Congress, Washington, D.C., 1894
- Edward Gibbon, Main Reading Room, Library of Congress, Washington, D.C., 1894
- Samuel Hahnemann Monument, Scott Circle, Washington, D.C., 1896-1900
- Hackley Park, Muskegon, Michigan:
  - Bust of Charles Hackley, 1890
  - Abraham Lincoln Monument, 1900. Replicas of Niehaus's Abraham Lincoln are at the Buffalo History Museum in Buffalo, New York, and at Library Park in Kenosha, Wisconsin.
  - David Farragut Monument, 1900
  - William McKinley Monument, 1902
- Bust of Robert Blum, Cincinnati Art Museum, Cincinnati, Ohio, ca. 1900
- The Driller, Edwin Drake Memorial, Woodlawn Cemetery, Titusville, Pennsylvania, 1901
- Equestrian Statue of General Forrest, Nathan Bedford Forrest Grave, Forrest Park, Memphis, Tennessee, 1901-1905
- Apotheosis of St. Louis, Forest Park, St. Louis, Missouri, 1906
- William McKinley, McKinley Memorial Mausoleum, Canton, Ohio, 1907. Niehaus also modeled the lunette bas-relief over the entrance.
- Benjamin Harrison, Indiana World War Memorial Plaza, Indianapolis, Indiana, 1908.
- James W. Beardsley, Beardsley Park, Bridgeport, Connecticut, 1909
- John Paul Jones, John Paul Jones Memorial, West Potomac Park, Washington, D.C., 1912. Niehaus's plaster original is at the United States Naval Academy, Annapolis, Maryland.
- Oliver Hazard Perry (1915–16), Front Park, Buffalo, New York.
- Orpheus with the Awkward Foot (Francis Scott Key Monument), Fort McHenry National Monument, Baltimore, Maryland, 1916-1922.
- Planting the Standard of Democracy in Honor of Newark's Soldiers, World War I Memorial, Lincoln Park, Newark, New Jersey, 1923.
- Hackensack War Monument, The Green, Bergen County Court House, Hackensack, New Jersey, 1924.
- At least 30 Civil War monuments and several World War I memorials.

=== United States Capitol ===
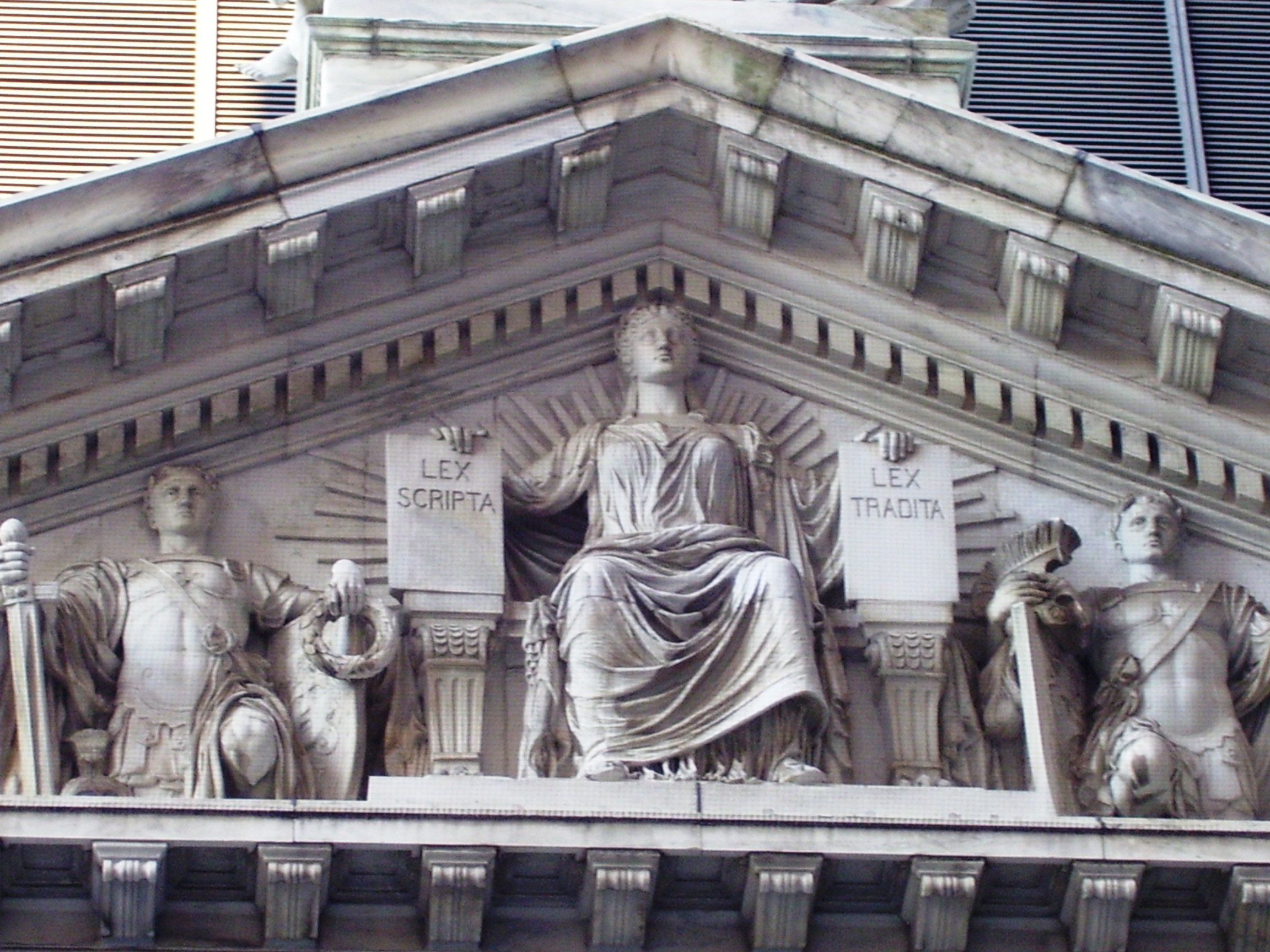
Triumph of Law (1896-1900), Appellate Court House, New York City

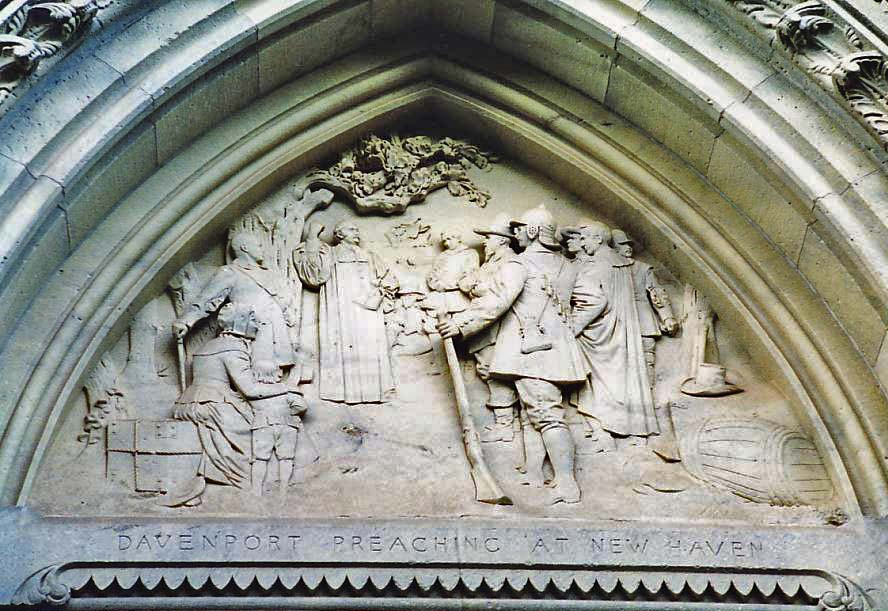
Davenport Preaching at New Haven (1895), Connecticut State Capitol, Hartford, Connecticut

Niehaus had eight statues in the National Statuary Hall Collection at the United States Capitol in Washington, D.C., a record for a sculptor. However, in 2003, Kansas replaced his statue of George Washington Glick with one of Dwight D. Eisenhower, in 2011, Michigan replaced his statue of Zachariah Chandler with one of Gerald R. Ford, in 2016, Ohio replaced his statue of William Allen with one of Thomas Edison, and, in 2022, Kansas replaced his statue of John James Ingalls with one of Amelia Earhart. His remaining four statues are still more than any other sculptor has in the Hall.

- James A. Garfield, 1886
- William Allen, 1887 (removed 2016)
- Oliver P. Morton, 1900
- John James Ingalls, 1905 (removed 2022)
- Zachariah Chandler, 1913 (removed 2011)
- George W. Glick, 1914 (removed 2003)
- Henry Clay, 1929
- Ephraim McDowell, 1929

There are also two busts by Niehaus in other collections:

- Bust of James A. Garfield, United States Senate Art Collection, ca. 1885.
- Bust of Daniel D. Tompkins, United States Senate Vice Presidential Bust Collection, 1891

=== Architectural sculpture ===
- Connecticut State Capitol, Hartford, Connecticut:
  - Bust of Joel Barlow, ca. 1885
  - Bust of George Berkeley, ca. 1885
  - Statue of John Davenport, 1889
  - Statue of Thomas Hooker, 1889
  - Bust of Reverend Jonathan Edwards, 1895
  - Bust of John Trumbull, 1895
  - Bas-relief of Hooker's March, 1895
  - Bas-relief of Davenport Preaching at New Haven, 1895
- Astor Memorial Doors (south doors), Trinity Church, New York City, 1895
- Two tympana, Thomas Jefferson Building, Library of Congress, Washington, D.C., ca. 1896
- Pedimental sculpture of The Triumph of Law, Appellate Court House, New York City, 1896–1900
- Pedimental sculpture, Kentucky State Capitol, Frankfort, Kentucky, 1907

== Gallery ==
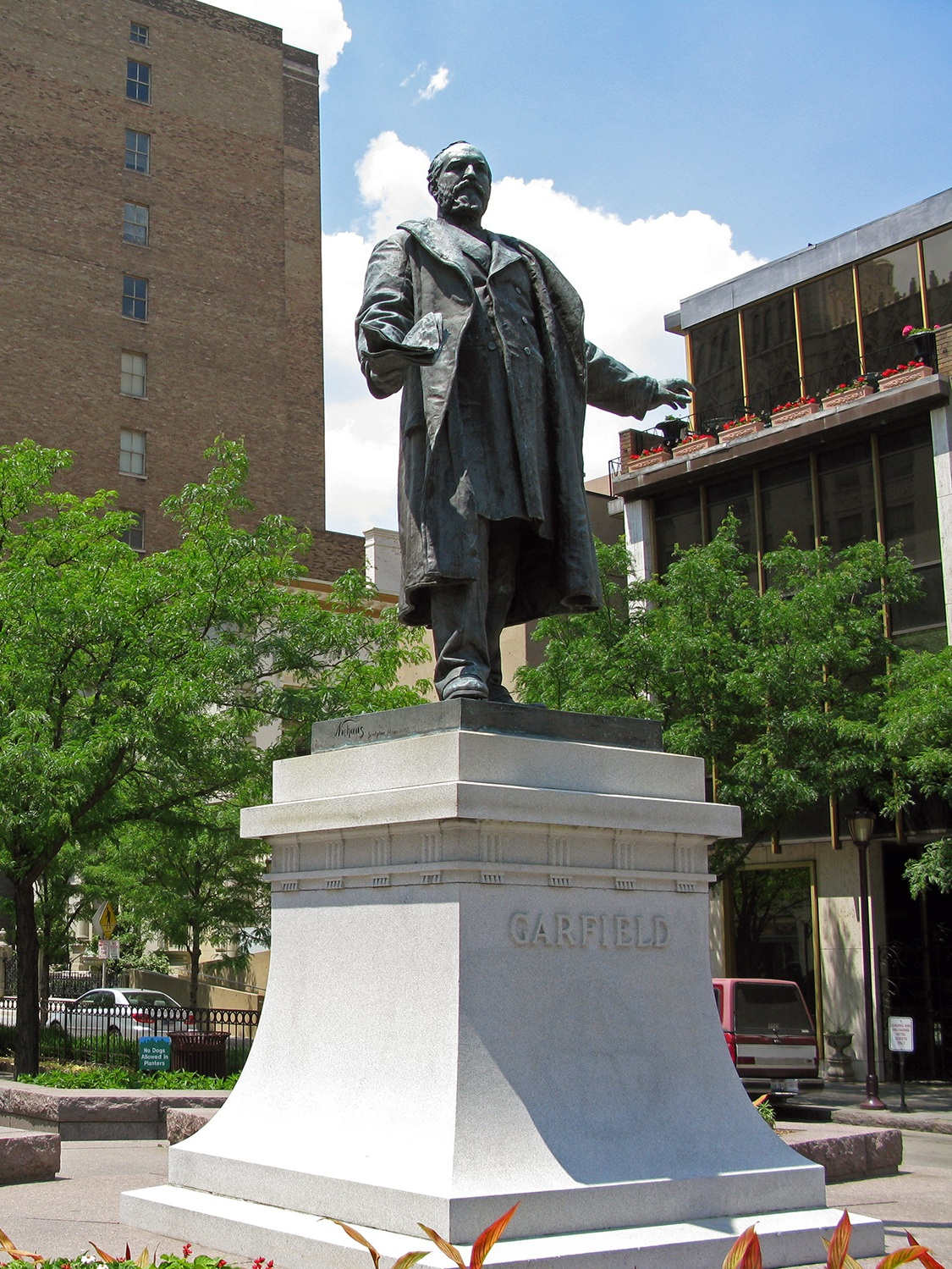
James A. Garfield (1882–87), Piatt Park, Cincinnati, Ohio

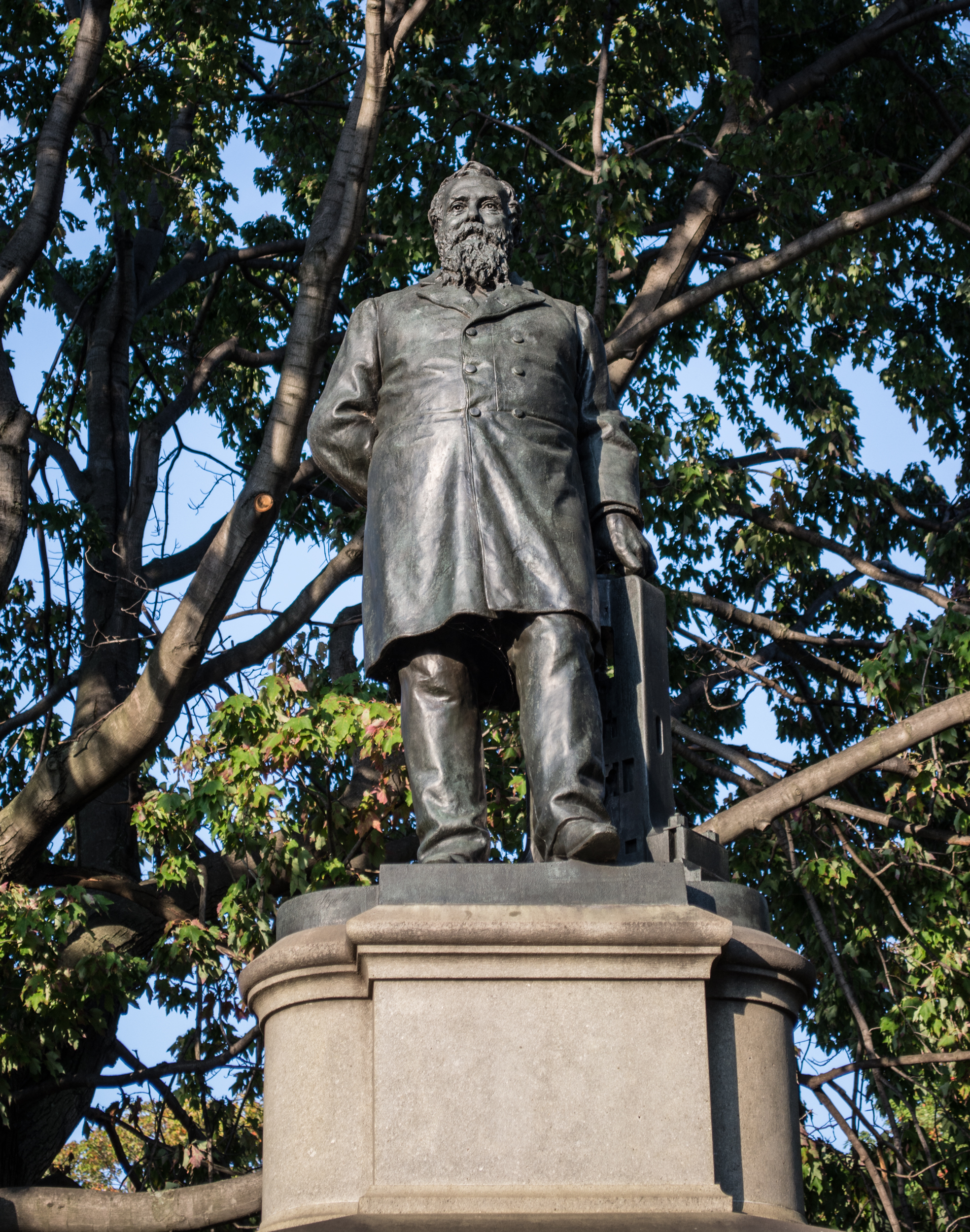
Henry Chisholm, (1884), Lake View Cemetery, Cleveland, Ohio

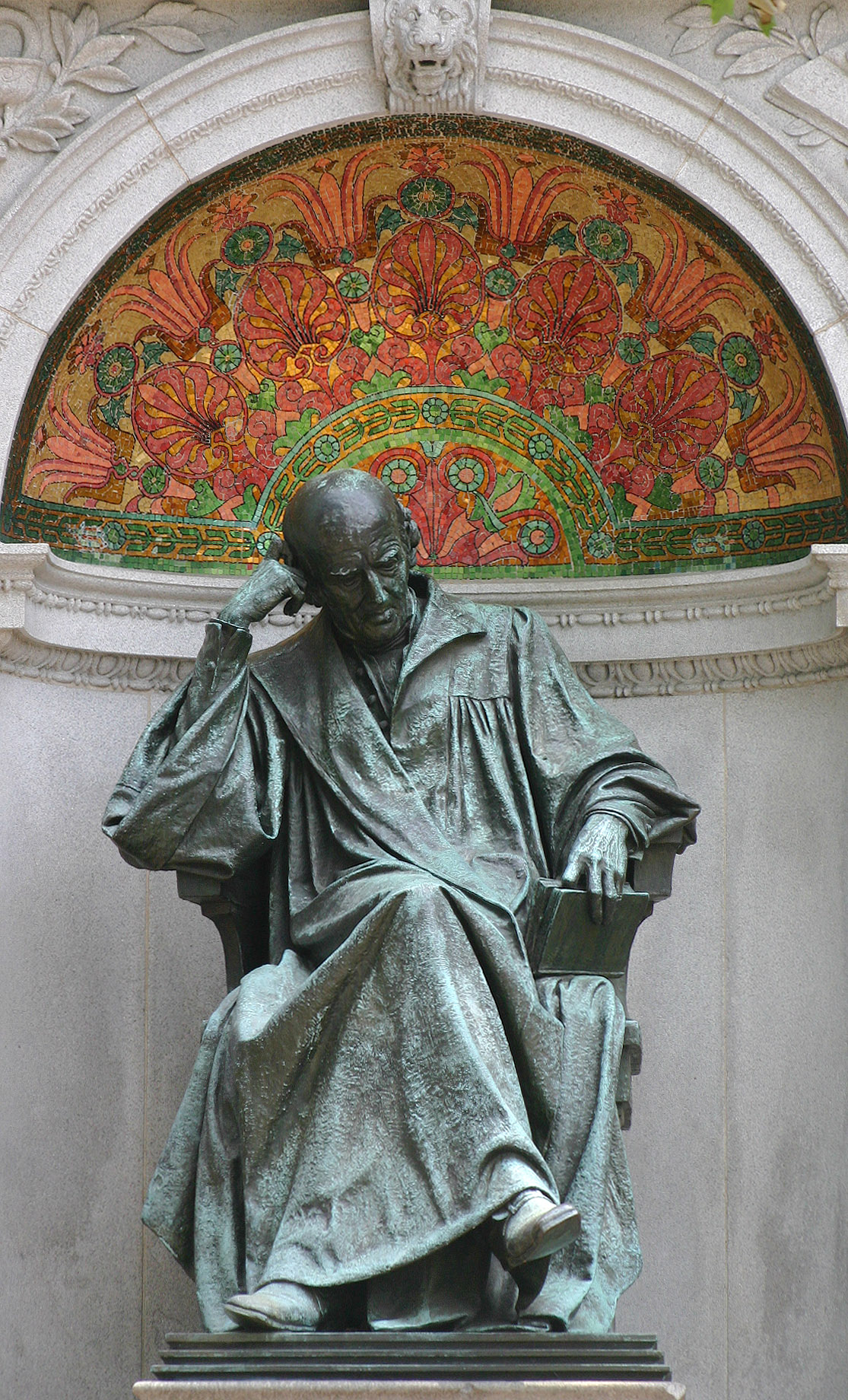
Samuel Hahnemann Monument (1896–1900), Scott Circle, Washington, D.C.

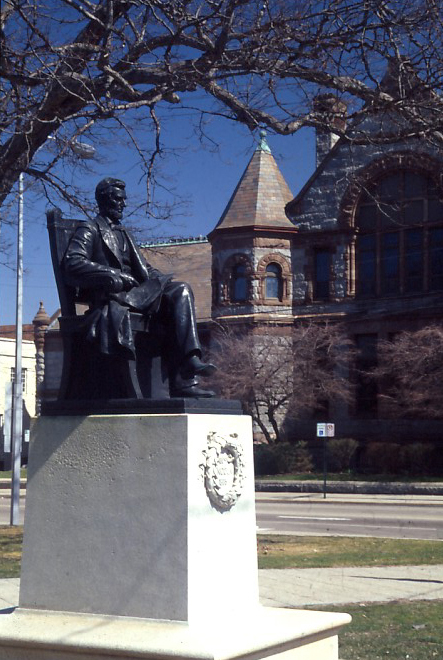
Abraham Lincoln Monument (1900), Hackley Park, Muskegon, Michigan

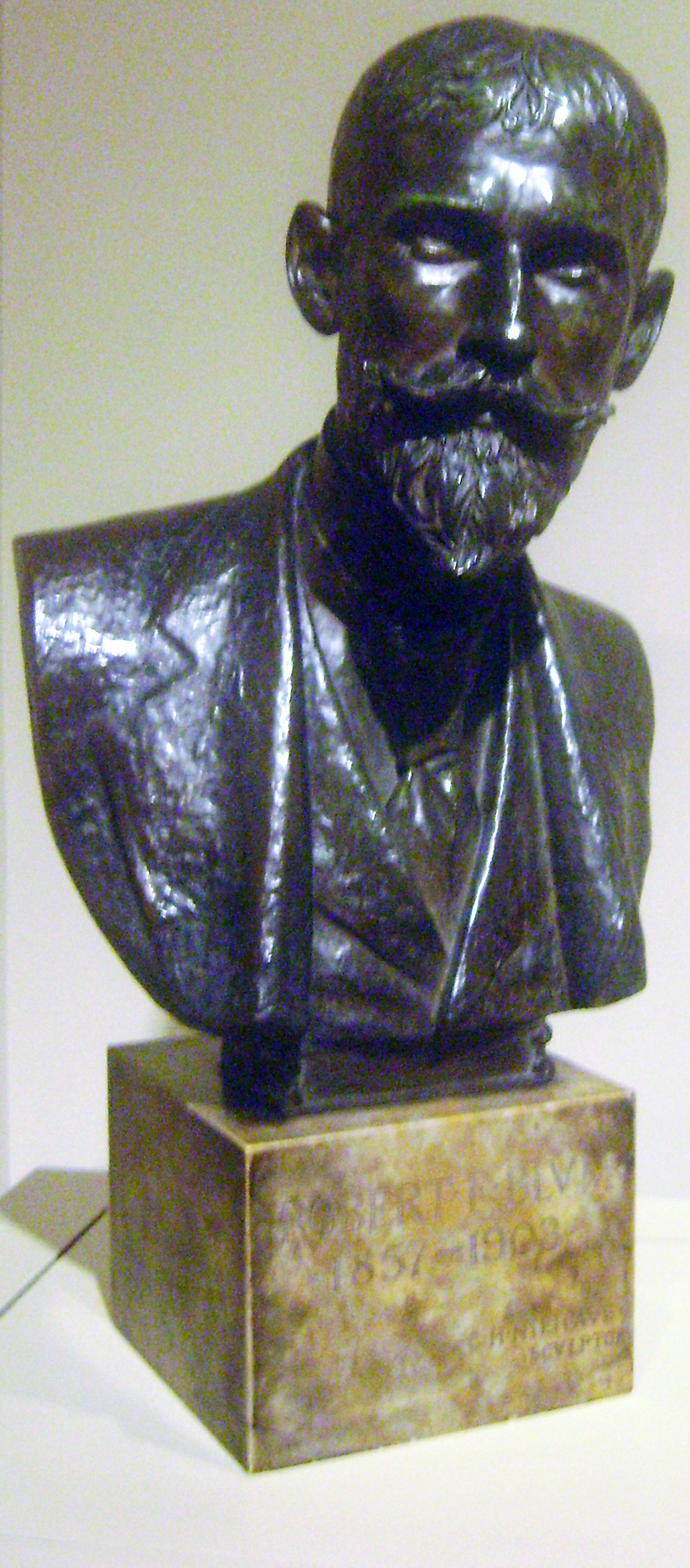
Bust of Robert Blum (ca. 1900), Cincinnati Art Museum, Cincinnati, Ohio

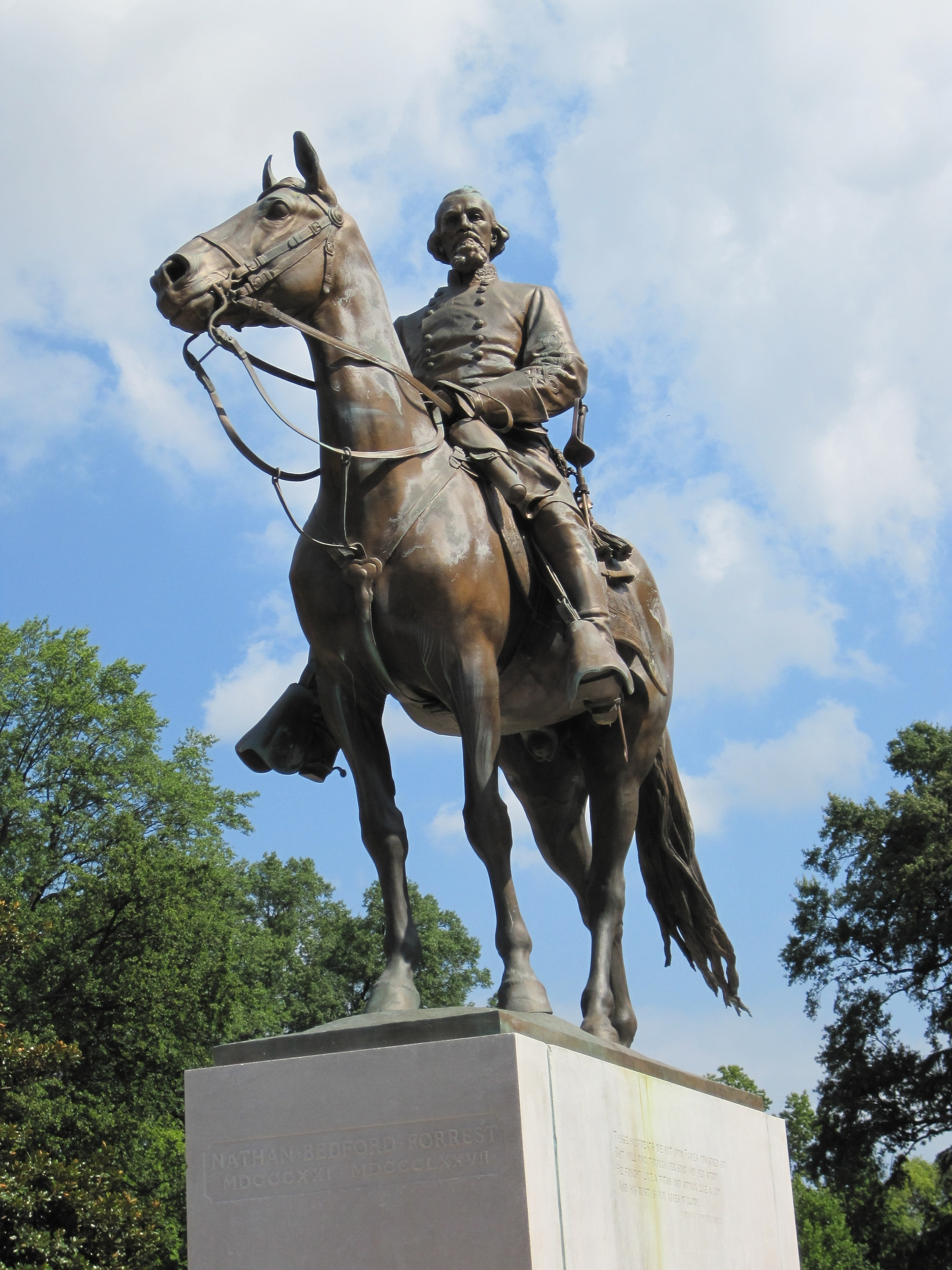
Nathan Bedford Forrest (1901–1905), Forrest Park, Memphis, Tennessee

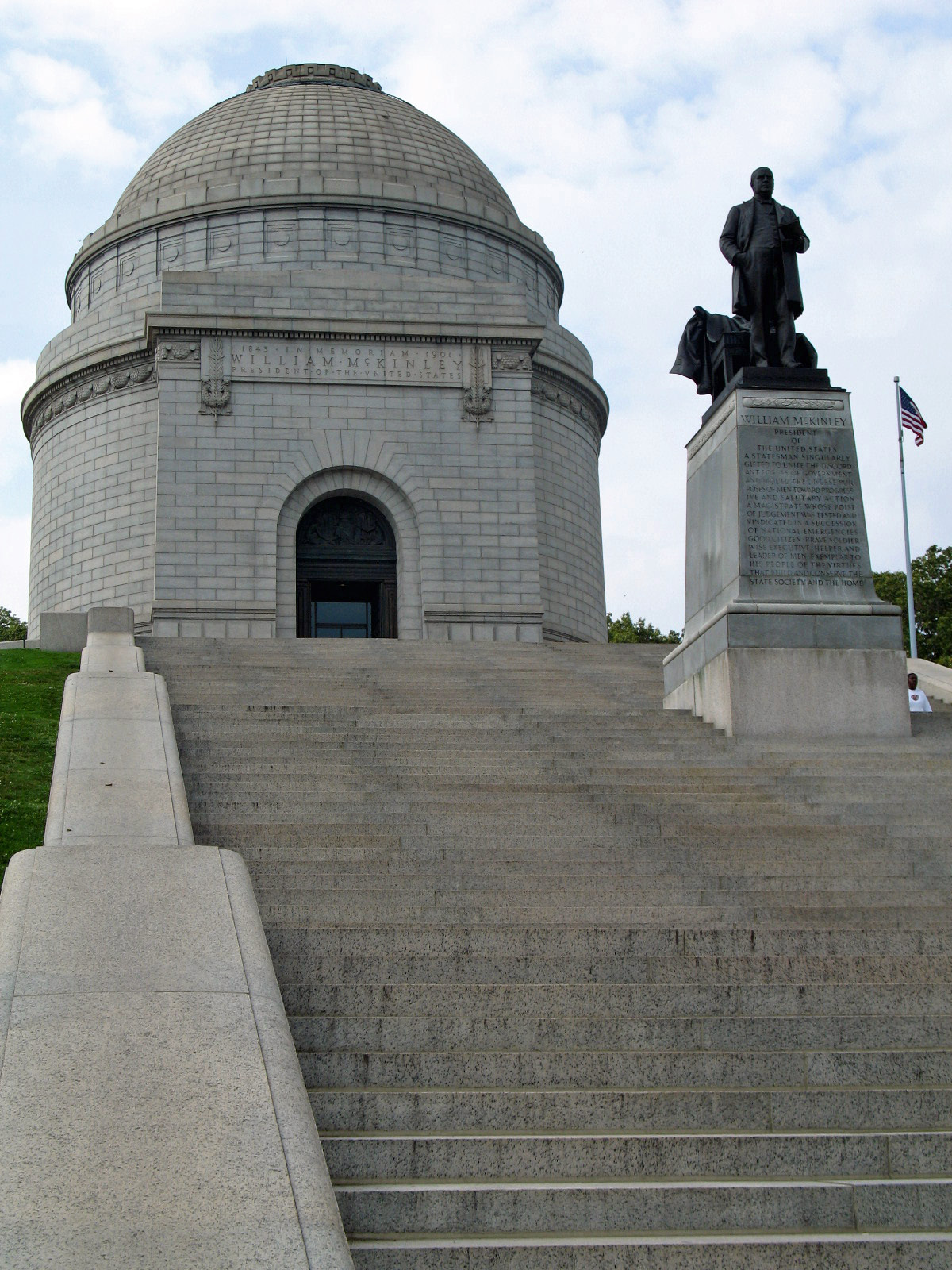
William McKinley (1907), McKinley Memorial Mausoleum, Canton, Ohio

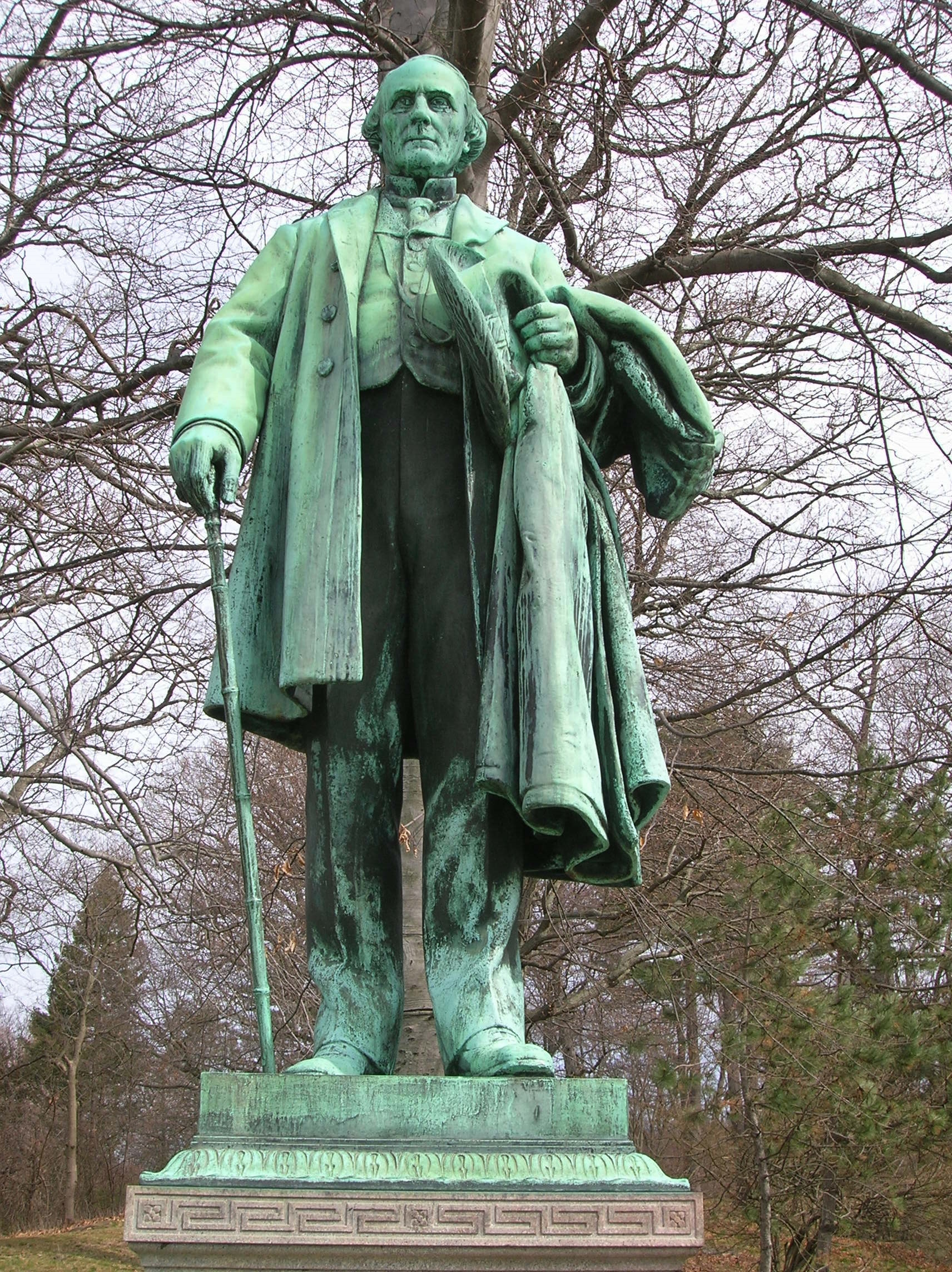
James W. Beardsley (1909), Beardsley Park, Bridgeport, Connecticut

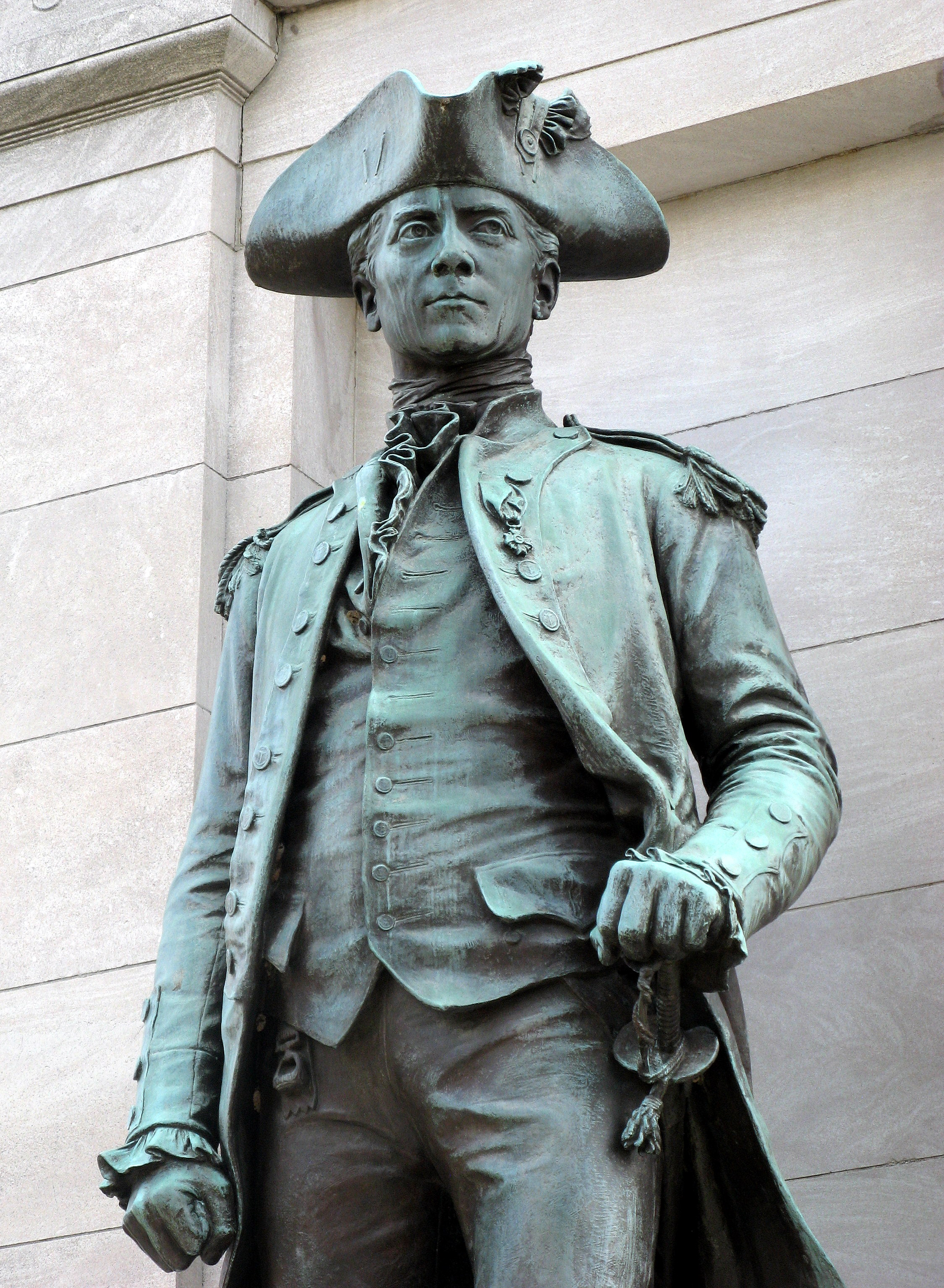
John Paul Jones (1912), John Paul Jones Memorial, Washington, D.C.

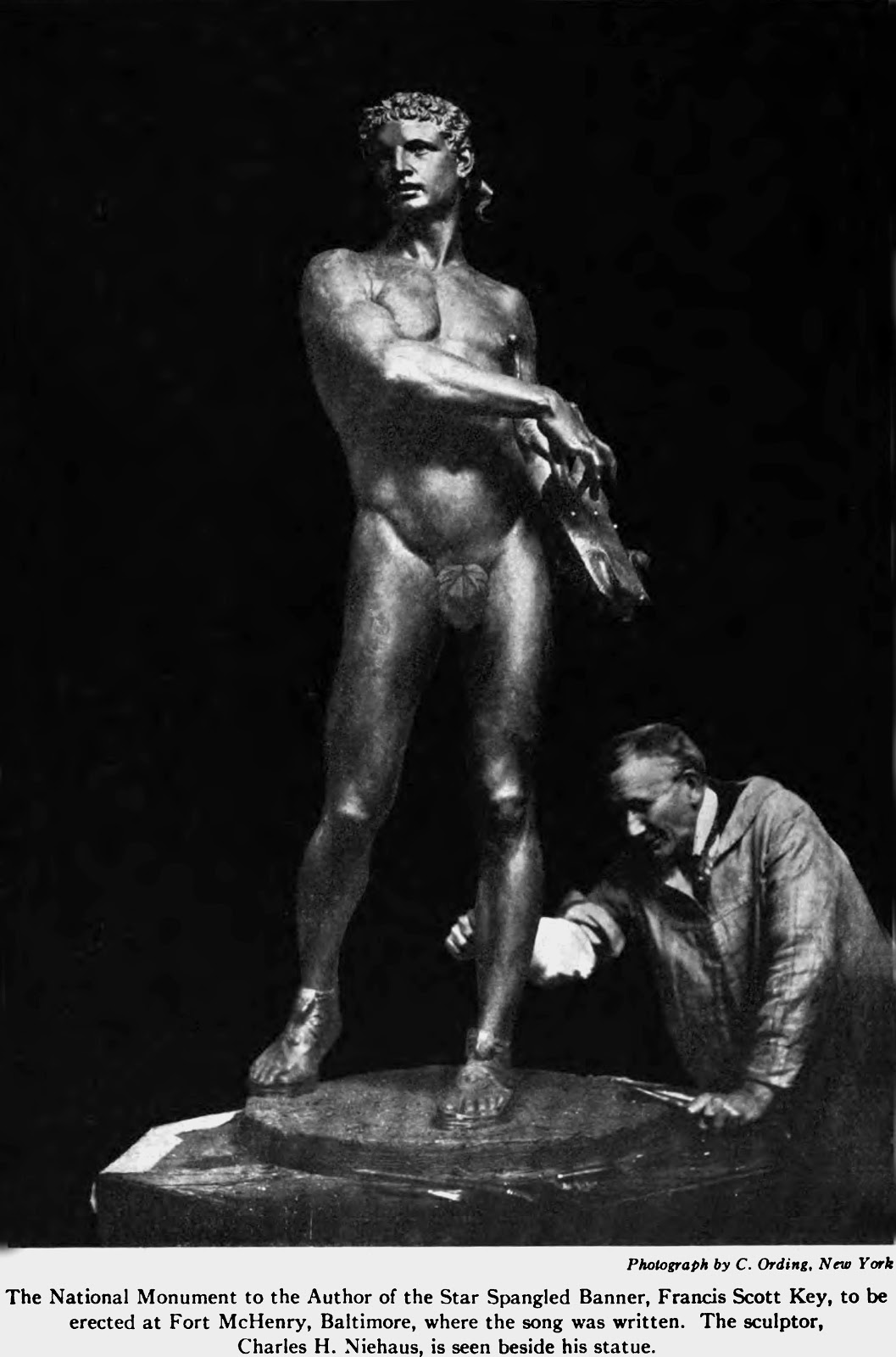
Niehaus with his model for Orpheus, (Francis Scott Key Monument) (1916–1922), Baltimore, Maryland

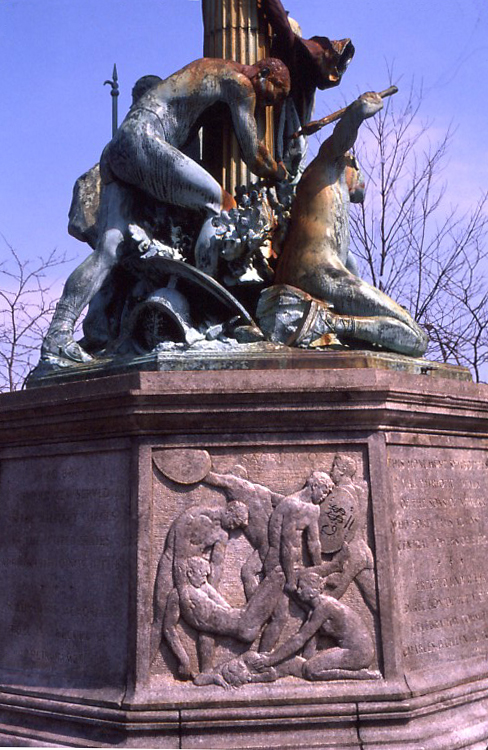
World War I Monument (1923), Lincoln Park, Newark, New Jersey

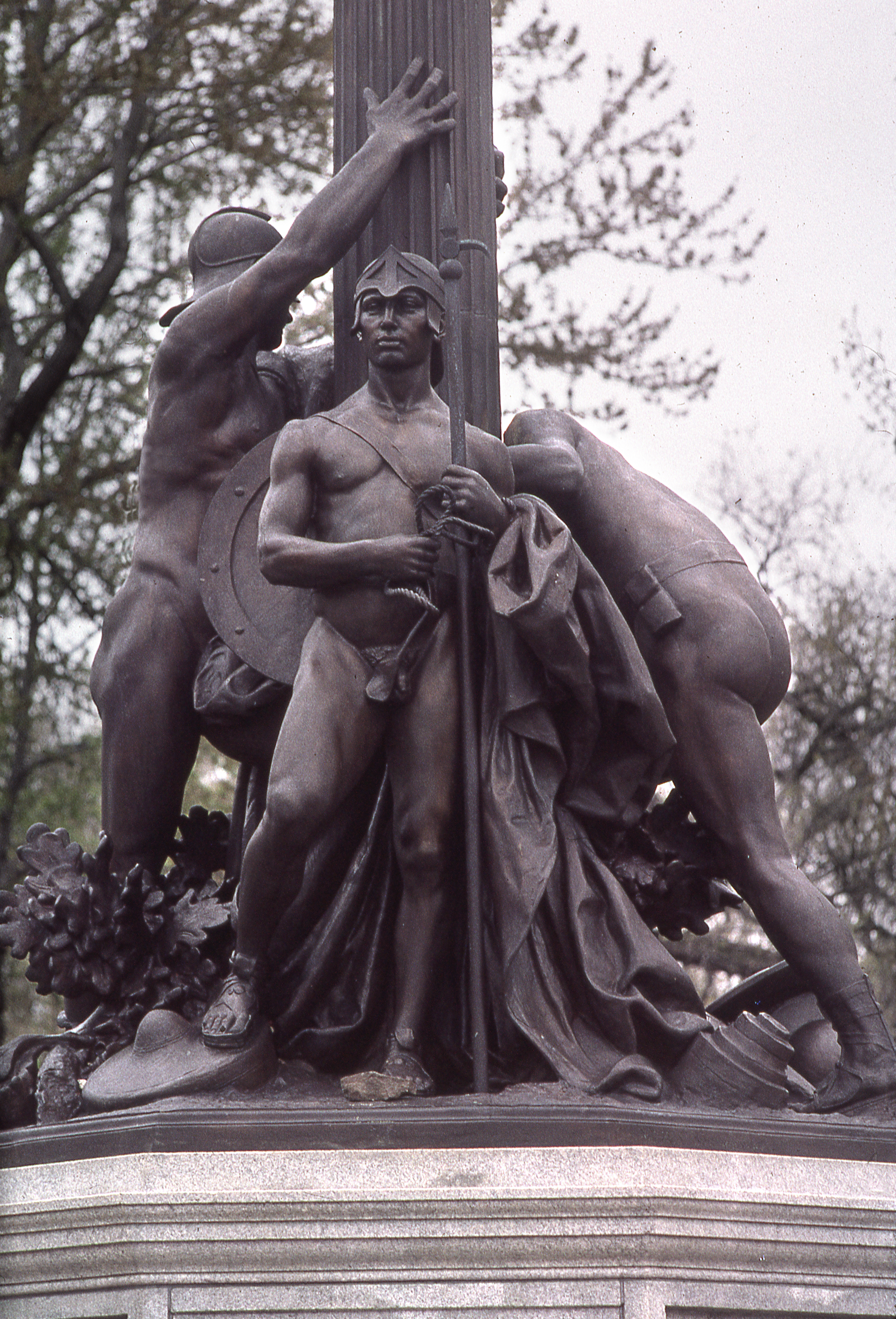
Planting the Standard of Democracy (1923), Lincoln Park, Newark, New Jersey

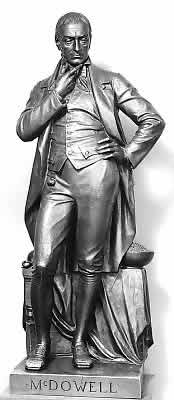
Ephraim McDowell (1929), United States Capitol, Washington, D.C.
