= Statue of James A. Garfield (Cincinnati) =

Public monument by Charles Henry Niehaus

James A. Garfield
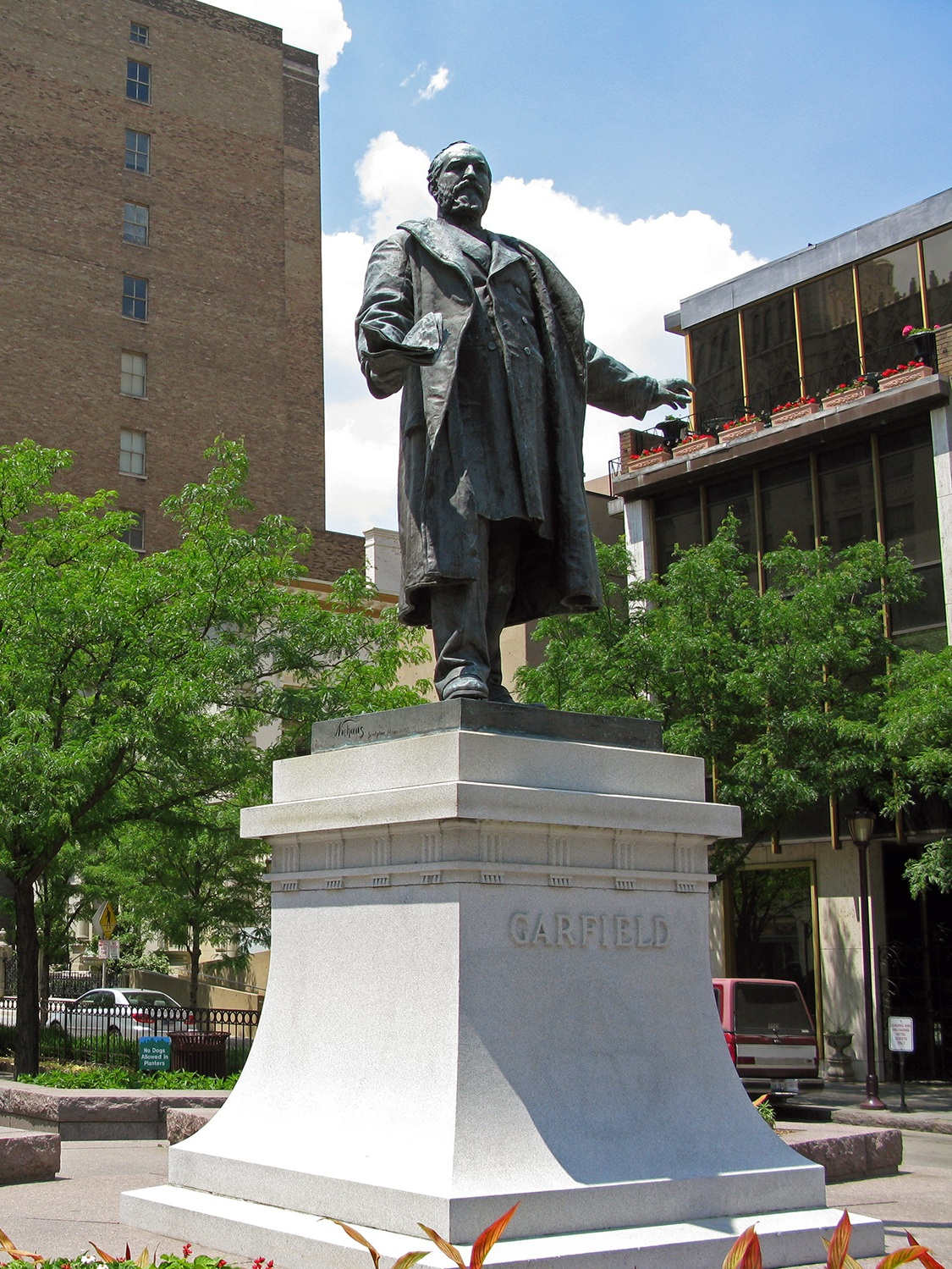
- Artist: Charles Henry Niehaus
- Year: 1885
- Medium: Bronze sculpture
- Subject: James A. Garfield
- Location: Cincinnati, Ohio, United States

A statue of James A. Garfield by Charles Henry Niehaus stands in Piatt Park, Cincinnati, Ohio, United States.

== See also ==
- Statue of James A. Garfield (U.S. Capitol), also by Niehaus
- List of memorials to James A. Garfield
- List of sculptures of presidents of the United States
