= Statue of Henry Clay (U.S. Capitol) =

Sculpture by Charles Henry Niehaus

Henry Clay
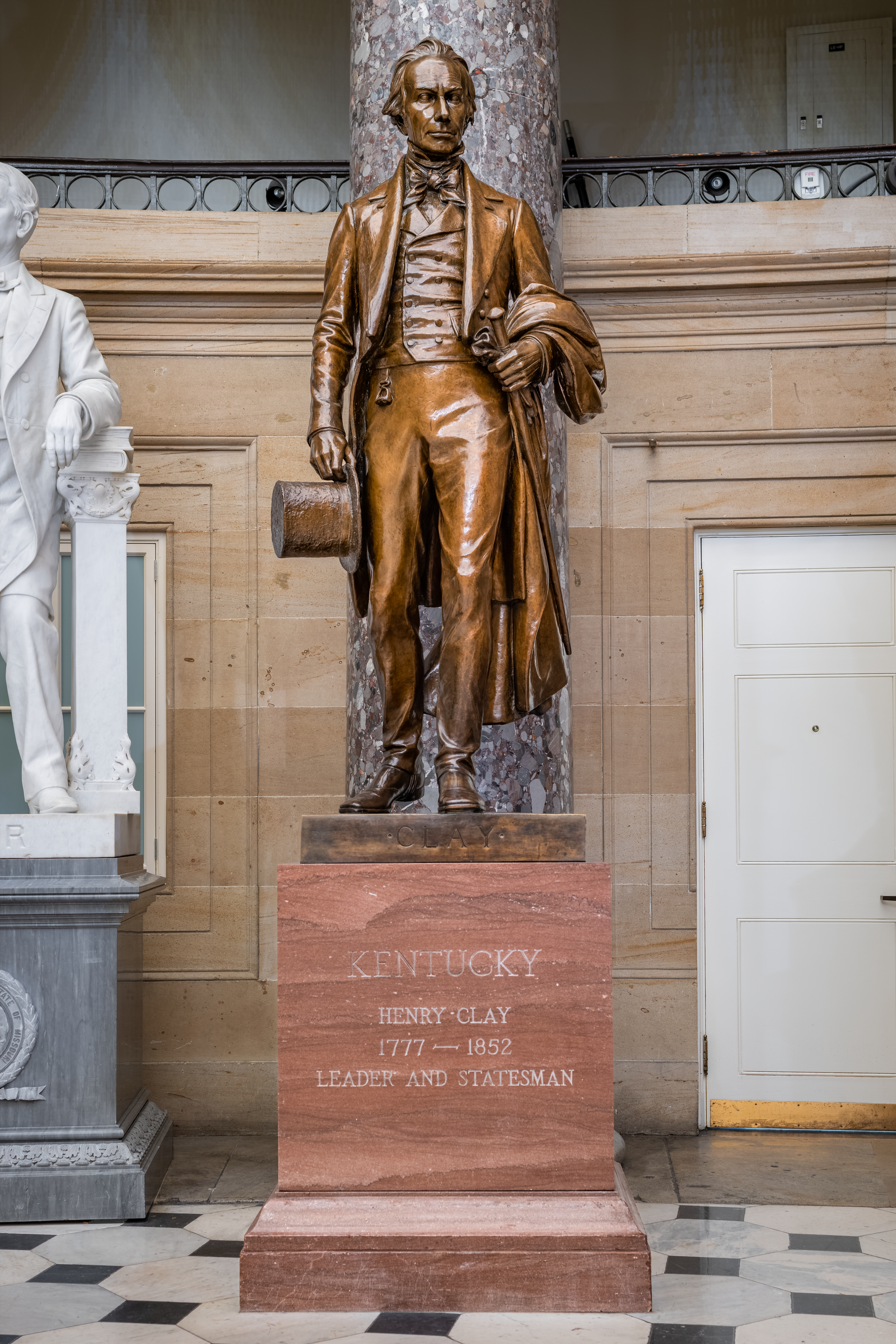
- The statue at the National Statuary Hall in 2023
- Artist: Charles Henry Niehaus
- Medium: Bronze sculpture
- Subject: Henry Clay
- Location: Washington, D.C., United States

Henry Clay is a 1929 bronze sculpture by Charles Henry Niehaus depicting the lawyer and politician Henry Clay, installed in the United States Capitol in Washington D.C. as part of the National Statuary Hall Collection. It is one of two statues donated by the state of Kentucky. The statue was accepted into the collection by Virgil Chapman on March 3, 1929.

The statue is one of eight that Niehaus has had placed in the collection.

A plaster version of the work, painted to resemble bronze, is located in the Kentucky State Capitol in Frankfort. A gift from the Kentucky State Bar Association, it was dedicated on November 19, 1930.
