= Statue of James A. Garfield (U.S. Capitol) =

Statue by Charles Henry Niehaus

James A. Garfield
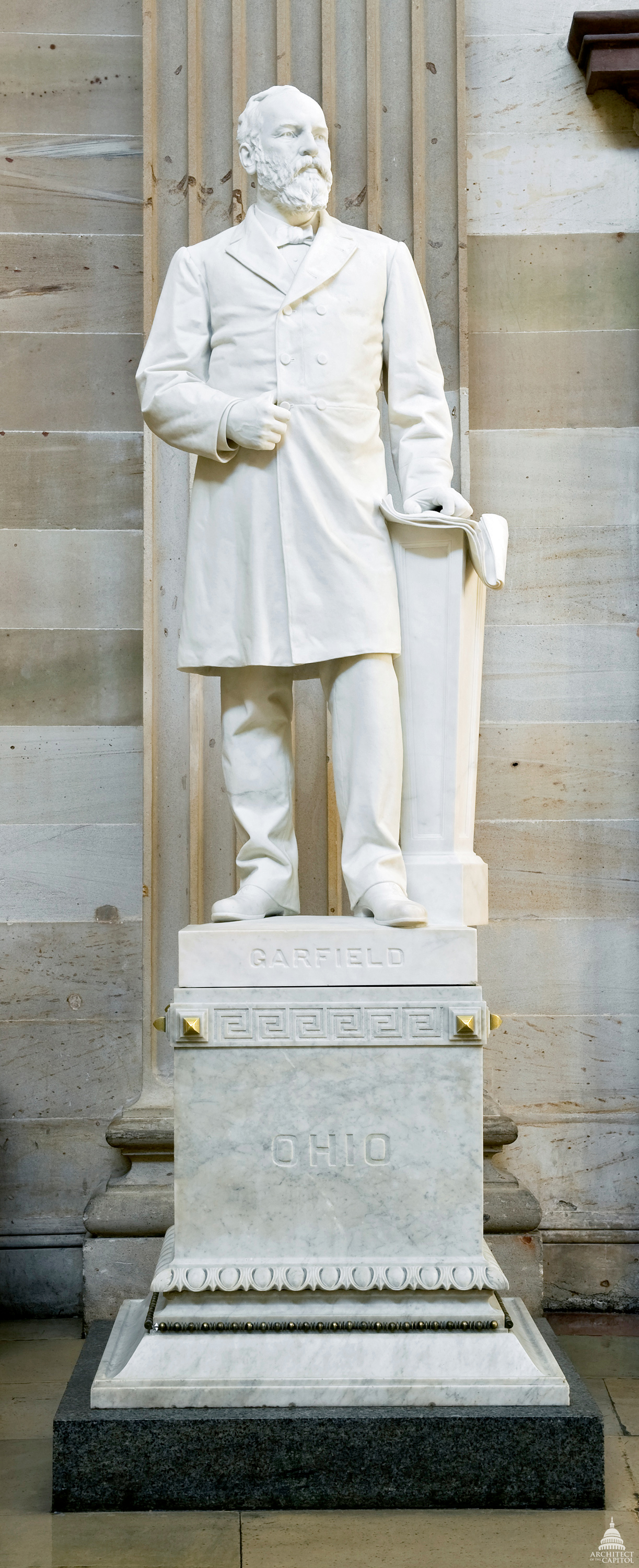
- Artist: Charles Henry Niehaus
- Medium: Marble sculpture
- Subject: James A. Garfield
- Location: Washington, D.C., United States

A statue of James A. Garfield by Charles Henry Niehaus stands in the United States Capitol's rotunda, in Washington, D.C., as part of the National Statuary Hall Collection. The marble statue was gifted by the U.S. state of Ohio in 1886.

== See also ==
- 1886 in art
- James A. Garfield Memorial
- James Garfield Memorial, Philadelphia
- James A. Garfield Monument
- Statue of James A. Garfield (Cincinnati), also by Niehaus
- List of sculptures of presidents of the United States
