= Garfield Lake =

Lake in the state of Minnesota, United States

- Location within Minnesota
- Location: Hubbard County, Minnesota
- Coordinates: 47°13′33″N 94°44′55″W
- Type: lake

Garfield Lake is a lake in Hubbard County, in the U.S. state of Minnesota.

The lake was named for James A. Garfield, 20th President of the United States.

== See also ==
- List of lakes in Minnesota
