= James A. Garfield Monument =

Statue by John Quincy Adams Ward in Washington, D.C., U.S.

- U.S. Historic district – Contributing property
- D.C. Inventory of Historic Sites
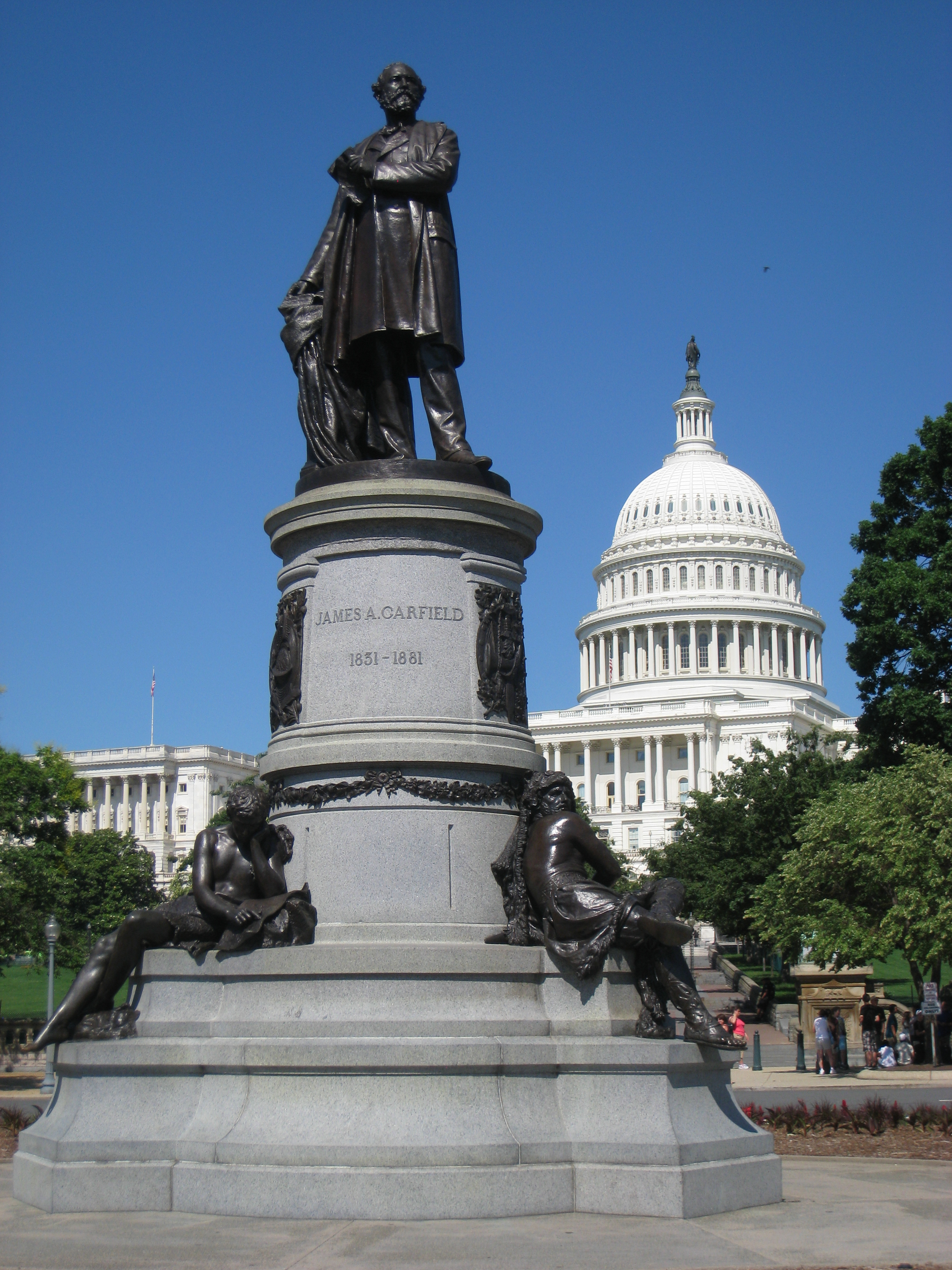
- Garfield Monument in 2008
- Location: First Street and Maryland Avenue SW, Washington, D.C., United States
- Coordinates: 38°53′20″N 77°00′44″W
- Built: 1887
- Architect: John Quincy Adams Ward (sculptor); Richard Morris Hunt (architect); Henry-Bonnard Bronze Company (founder)
- Part of: National Mall Historic District (66000031); L'Enfant Plan (97000332)

Significant dates
- Designated CP: October 15, 1966 (National Mall); April 24, 1997 (L'Enfant Plan)
- Designated DCIHS: November 8, 1964 (National Mall); January 19, 1971 (L'Enfant Plan)

The James A. Garfield Monument stands on the grounds of the United States Capitol in Garfield Circle, a traffic circle at First Street and Maryland Avenue SW in Washington, D.C. It is a memorial to U.S. president James A. Garfield, who was elected in 1880 and assassinated in 1881 after serving only four months of his term. The perpetrator was an attorney and disgruntled office-seeker named Charles J. Guiteau. Garfield lived for several weeks after the shooting, but eventually succumbed to his injuries. The monument is part of a three-part sculptural group near the Capitol Reflecting Pool, including the Peace Monument and the Ulysses S. Grant Memorial in Union Square. The monument is also a contributing property to the National Mall and L'Enfant Plan, both of which are listed on the National Register of Historic Places and the District of Columbia Inventory of Historic Sites. The bronze statue rests on a granite pedestal that features three sculptures, each one representing a time period in Garfield's life.

The monument, sculpted by John Quincy Adams Ward and cast by The Henry-Bonnard Co. of New York, with a pedestal designed by Richard Morris Hunt, is an outstanding example of Beaux-Arts architecture. It was unveiled on May 12, 1887. The memorial was commissioned in 1884 by the Society of the Army of the Cumberland, of which Garfield had been a member. The Society raised almost $28,000 to pay the sculptor. Some of the funds were raised by The Garfield Monument Fair, which was held in the Capitol's Rotunda and National Statuary Hall in 1882. Also in that year, Congress appropriated to the Society $7,500 in funds from the sale of condemned cannons; in 1884 it appropriated $30,000 for the pedestal. The monument was incorporated into the United States Capitol Complex on January 2, 1975.

== History ==
=== Biography ===
James A. Garfield was born on November 19, 1831, in Moreland Hills, Ohio. His father died when Garfield was young and he grew up very poor. After an attempt to live on his own, he returned to his mother and attended Geauga Seminary. After graduating from the seminary, Garfield worked a variety of jobs and became a teacher at Hiram College, where he also worked as a janitor. As a born again Christian, Garfield preached on occasion, receiving much needed money at certain churches on his circuit. After teaching for a few years, Garfield attended Williams College, graduating in 1856, and learned about the abolitionist philosophy while in Massachusetts. He returned to Ohio and taught at Hiram College once again. During the years leading up to the Civil War, Garfield had become interested in politics and supported the new Republican Party. He was elected to the Ohio Senate in 1860, serving in that role until the following year.

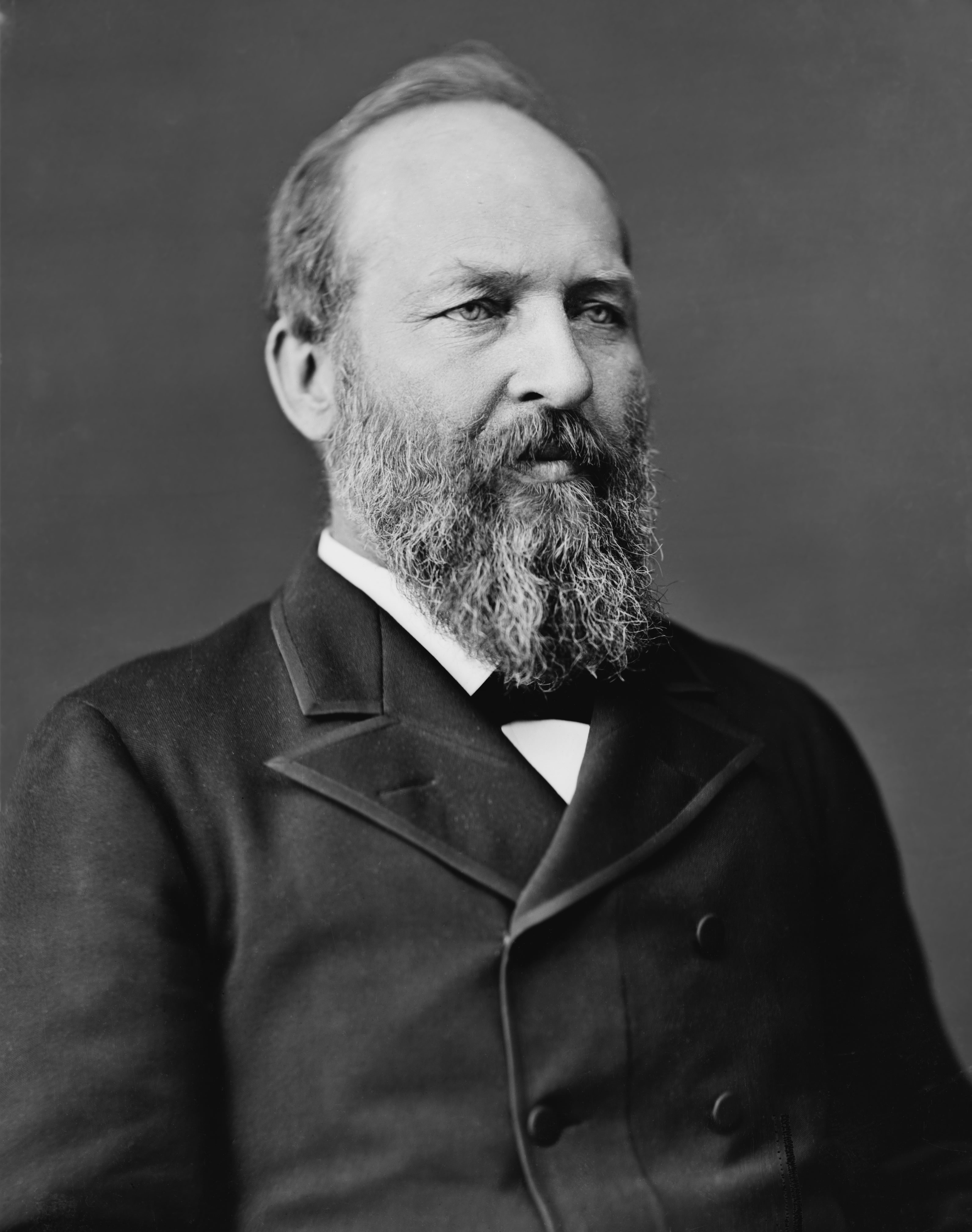
Garfield in 1881

During the Civil War, Garfield was commissioned a colonel. His first and only battle where he led Union Army forces was at the Battle of Middle Creek, which the Union Army won. After the battle, Garfield was promoted to brigadier general. He was later promoted to chief of staff to the Army of the Cumberland. In 1863, Garfield left the military and ran for U.S. Congress. He won the election and served in the U.S. House of Representatives for 17 years. Garfield successfully ran for president as a Republican in the 1880 United States presidential election.

After serving as president for only four months, Garfield was shot at the Baltimore and Potomac Railroad Station in Washington, D.C. The perpetrator, Charles J. Guiteau, was an attorney and unsuccessful politician. Attempts were made to bring him back to good health, but three months after the shooting, he died on September 19, 1881. Almost immediately after news of the president's death was announced, members of the Society of the Army of the Cumberland (SAC), who were attending their annual reunion, established the Garfield Memorial Committee that would oversee the erection of a monument to Garfield.

=== Memorial plans ===
The SAC was able to raise almost $28,000, through donations and benefits, like the 1882 Garfield Monument Fair, which took place in the United States Capitol rotunda and National Statuary Hall. Another fundraiser that year was by Congress, who sold condemned cannons from the Civil War to allocate $7,500 for the monument. Two years later on July 7, 1884, Congress further allocated $30,000 for the pedestal. During the 1883 reunion, the SAC selected John Quincy Adams Ward to be the monument's sculptor. Ward has already sculpted the equestrian statue of George Henry Thomas for the SAC, so the two parties were on friendly terms. He was also known as one of the best sculptors during that time period. Ward chose his friend Richard Morris Hunt to be the architect of the monument's pedestal. The Henry-Bonnard Bronze Company was chosen to be the founder for the project. The total price for the monument and its installation was $62,539.

=== Dedication ===
On the morning of May 12, 1887, a gun salute was fired from the Marine Barracks in honor of the day's event. Later that morning, members of the SAC met at the Arlington Hotel, followed by a march to the Grand Army of the Republic Hall. At 11:30am, a procession of SAC members joined with the District of Columbia militia and members of the Grand Army of the Republic to march in a parade to the monument site. There were many onlookers that day, crowding around the circle to get a glimpse of the event. At noon, guests of honor were seated in the temporary grandstand built for the ceremony. Those seated in the grandstand included Secretary of State Thomas F. Bayard, U.S. Attorney General Augustus H. Garland, Chief Justice Morrison Waite and other justices of the Supreme Court, philanthropist William Wilson Corcoran, Judge Alexander Burton Hagner, Ward and Hunt, and several generals of the Civil War.

President Grover Cleveland and General Phillip Sheridan, who served as president of the SAC, arrived at 1pm and sat at the front of the grandstand. Colonel Wilson began the ceremony by introducing Reverend S.H. Giesyd, who delivered an opening prayer. The United States Marine Band performed The Star-Spangled Banner followed by the unveiling of the monument. There was then a gun salute on the Capitol grounds. Sheridan then introduced the keynote speaker, Major General J. Warren Keifer, who talked about Garfield's life. After his speech, Keifer formally gave the monument to Sheridan, who then passed ownership to Cleveland. It was at this time Cleveland spoke about Garfield, patriotism, and the grandeur of monuments that were being erected throughout Washington, D.C. After the president spoke, Hail, Columbia was played by the Marine Band and a benediction was given by Reverend F.D. Power.

=== Later history ===
The monument is a contributing property to the National Mall, which was listed on the District of Columbia Inventory of Historic Sites (DCIHS) on November 8, 1964, and the National Register of Historic Places (NRHP) on October 15, 1966. It is also a contributing property to the L'Enfant Plan, listed on the DCIHS on January 19, 1971, and the NRHP on April 24, 1997. The monument was incorporated into the United States Capitol Complex on January 2, 1975. In 1992, the Architect of the Capitol had the monument cleaned via low-pressure washing to the bronze sculptures. Additional steps to preserve the monument was the application of a corrosion inhibitor and the sculptures being repatinated. An acrylic lacquer and wax was the final step in protecting the statues. The lead joints were repaired, and the sidewalks around the circle were improved. In addition to the monument, there is a park named after him and a statue of Garfield in the National Statuary Hall Collection.

== Location and design ==
=== Location ===
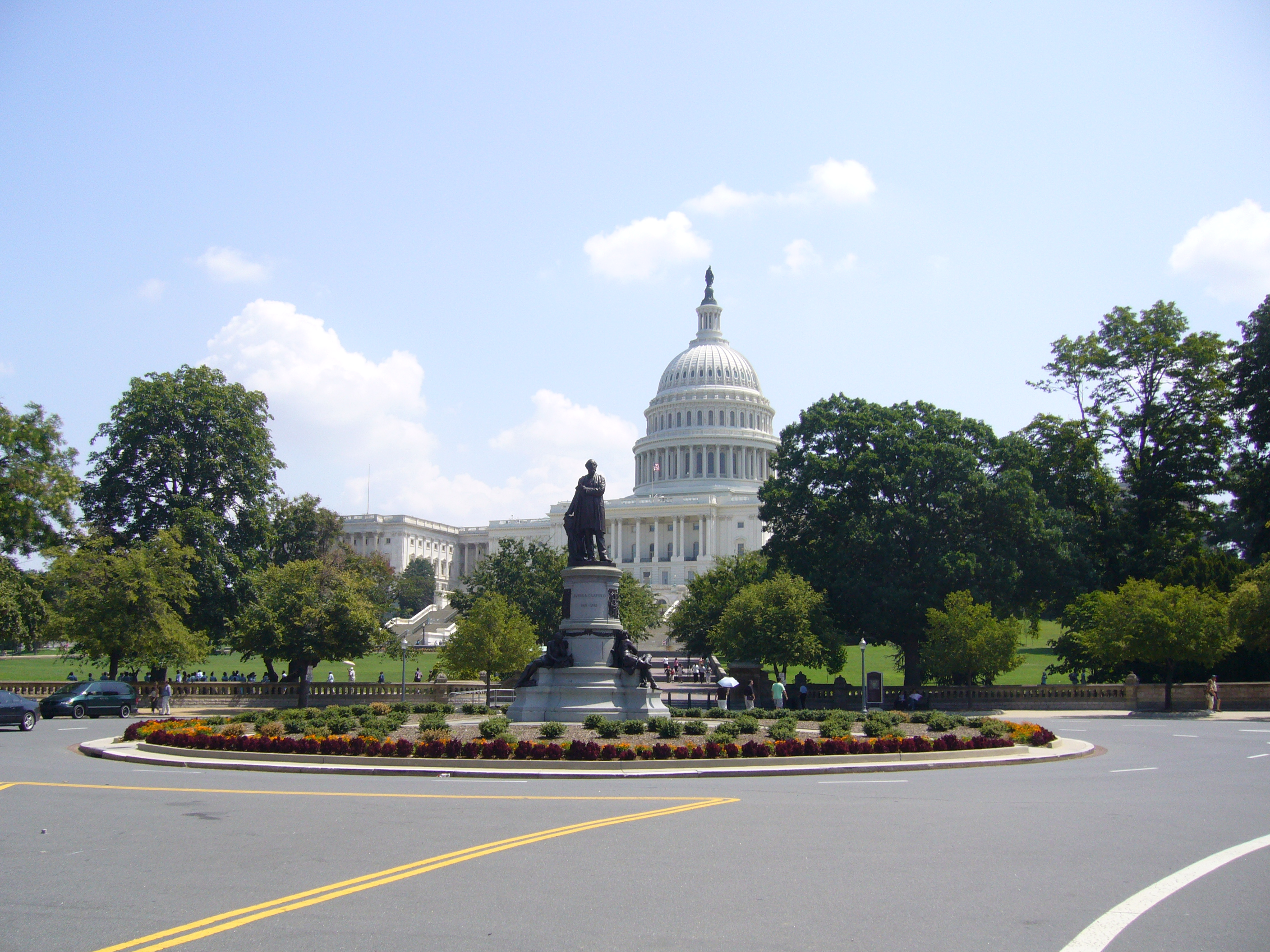
Garfield Circle

The monument is sited on Reservation 202, Garfield Circle, at the intersection of First Street and Maryland Avenue NW in Union Square, Washington, D.C. The placement of the monument compliments the Peace Circle and its Peace Monument. The Ulysses S. Grant Memorial is located between the two smaller monuments. The Garfield monument is on the west side of the United States Capitol Complex, which is under the jurisdiction of the Architect of the Capitol.

=== Design ===
The total height of the bronze sculpture of Garfield is 9-feet (2.7 m). It rests on a granite pedestal that is tapered and cylindrical, and measures 16-feet (4.9 m) tall. The three bronze sculptures on the monument's pedestal measure 5-feet (1.5 m). Garfield is depicted standing, wearing a long coat over his suit. He has a beard and moustache, and his hair is wavy. Garfield is looking into the distance while holding a stack of papers from his inauguration. Beside him is a small column draped with fabric. There is an open book on the column and Garfield is placing his hand on it.

The pedestal is a fine example of Beaux-Arts and Baroque art, with three elaborate bronze figures that Ward worked on more than the statue of Garfield. Plaques depicting swords and globes are on the second tier of the pedestal, just above the three figures. They are all Roman males and seated near the bottom of the monument. Each one represents a time period of Garfield's life: teacher, soldier, and statesman. The one representing his early career features a bare-foot student wearing a tunic made from sheep skin while holding paper with his left hand. The second sculpture, representing Garfield's military career, is a middle-aged man, wearing wolf skin, fur boats, and a fur tunic, while reaching for a sword with his right hand. The third sculpture which represents his years as a statesman and politician, is wearing sandals and a long robe. His right hand is holding a tablet that reads "Law Justice Prosperity".

==== Inscriptions ====
The following inscriptions are on the monument:

(On Garfield statue:)

J.Q.A. Ward
Sculp. 1887
The Henry-Bonnard Bronze Co. New York

(On speech held in Garfield's proper left hand:)

Law, Justice, Prosperity

(On each base figure:)

J.Q.A. Ward Sculp

(Base, top section, front:)

James. A. Garfield 1831–1881

(Base, top section, left side:)

Major-General U-S-V, Member of Congress, Senator, and President of The United States of America

(Base, top section, right side:)

Erected by his Comrades of the Society of the Army of the Cumberland May 18, 1887

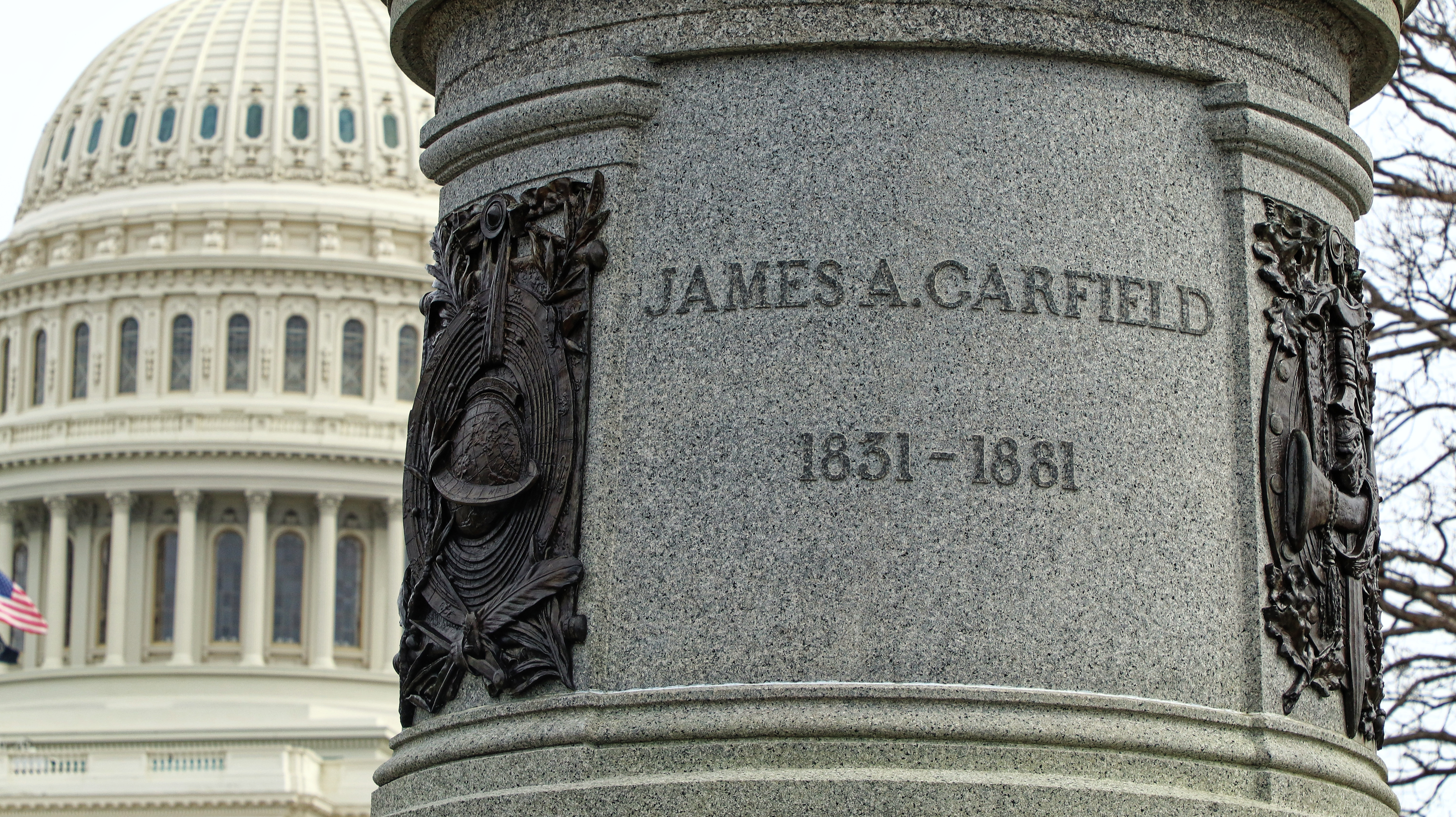
Inscription on the pedestal

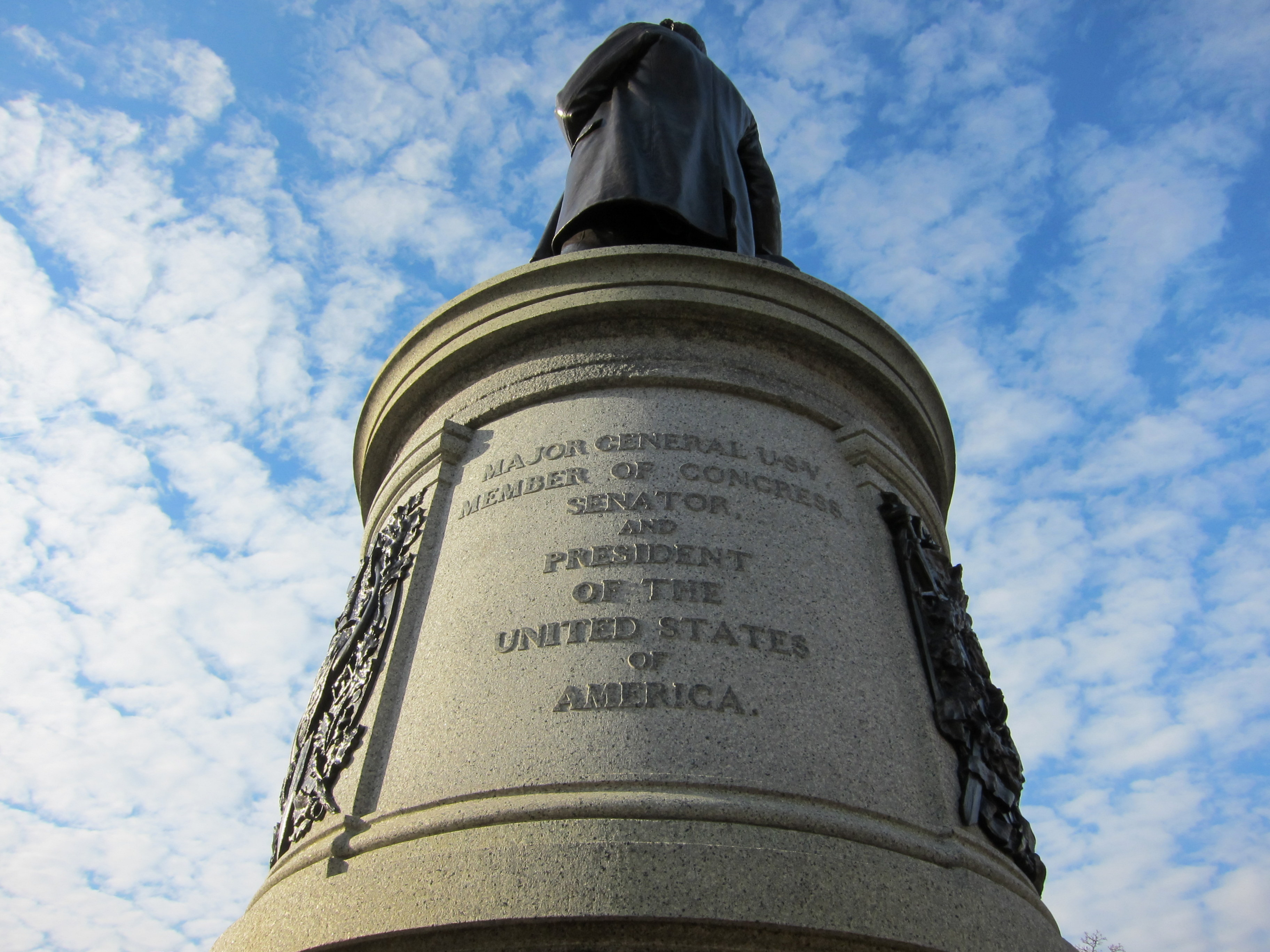
Inscription on the pedestal

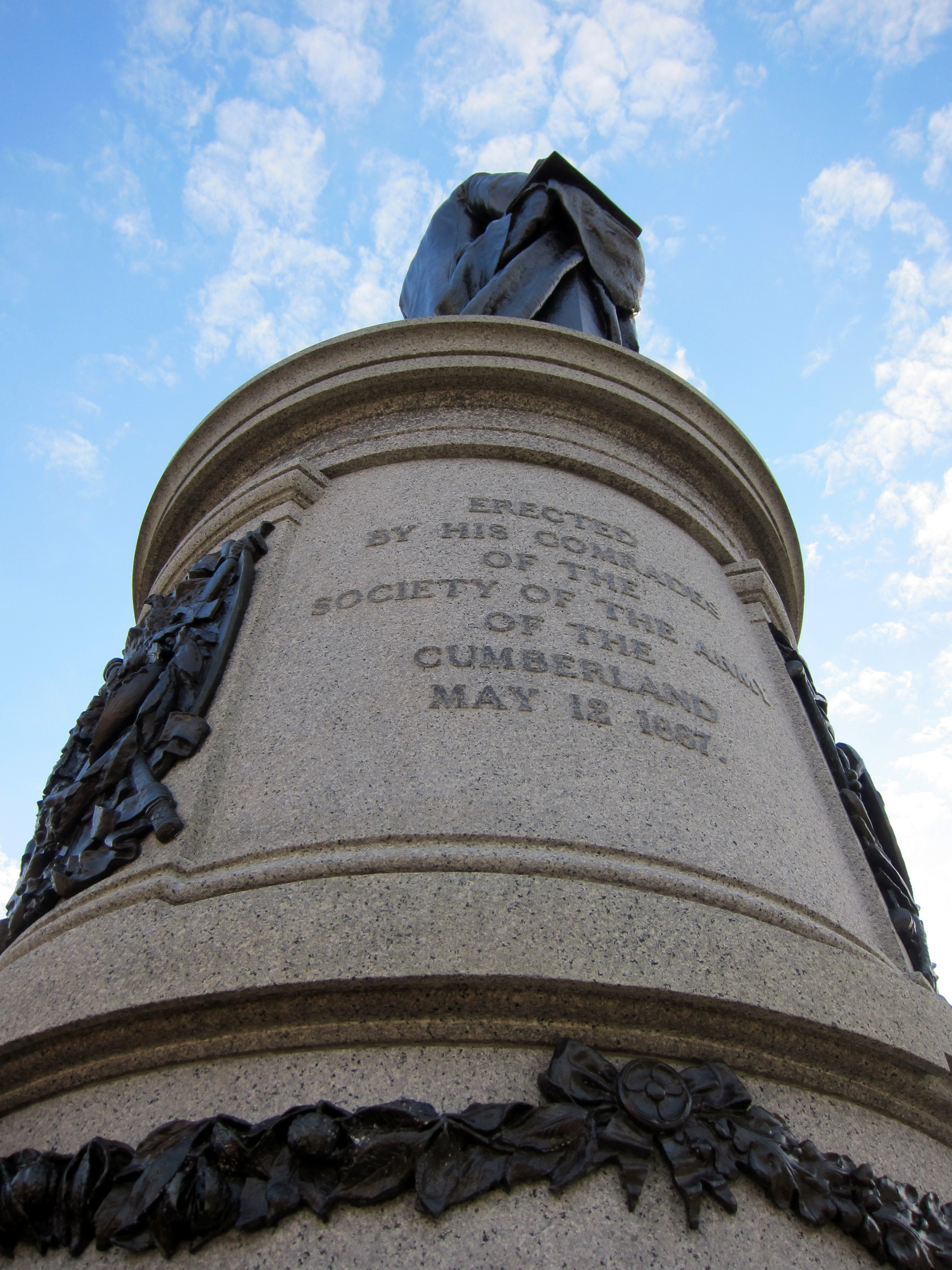
Inscription on the pedestal

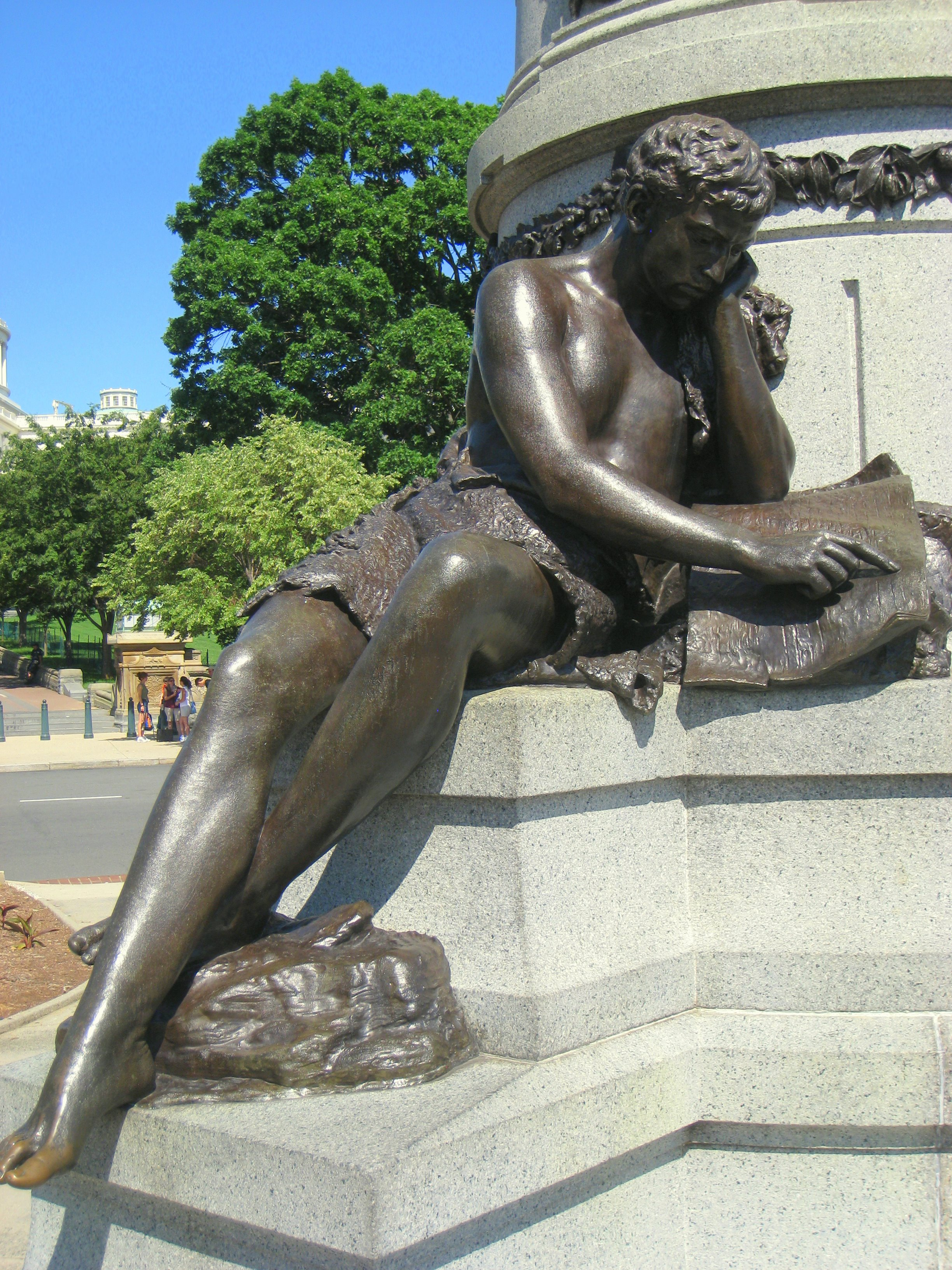
One of three sculptures on the pedestal

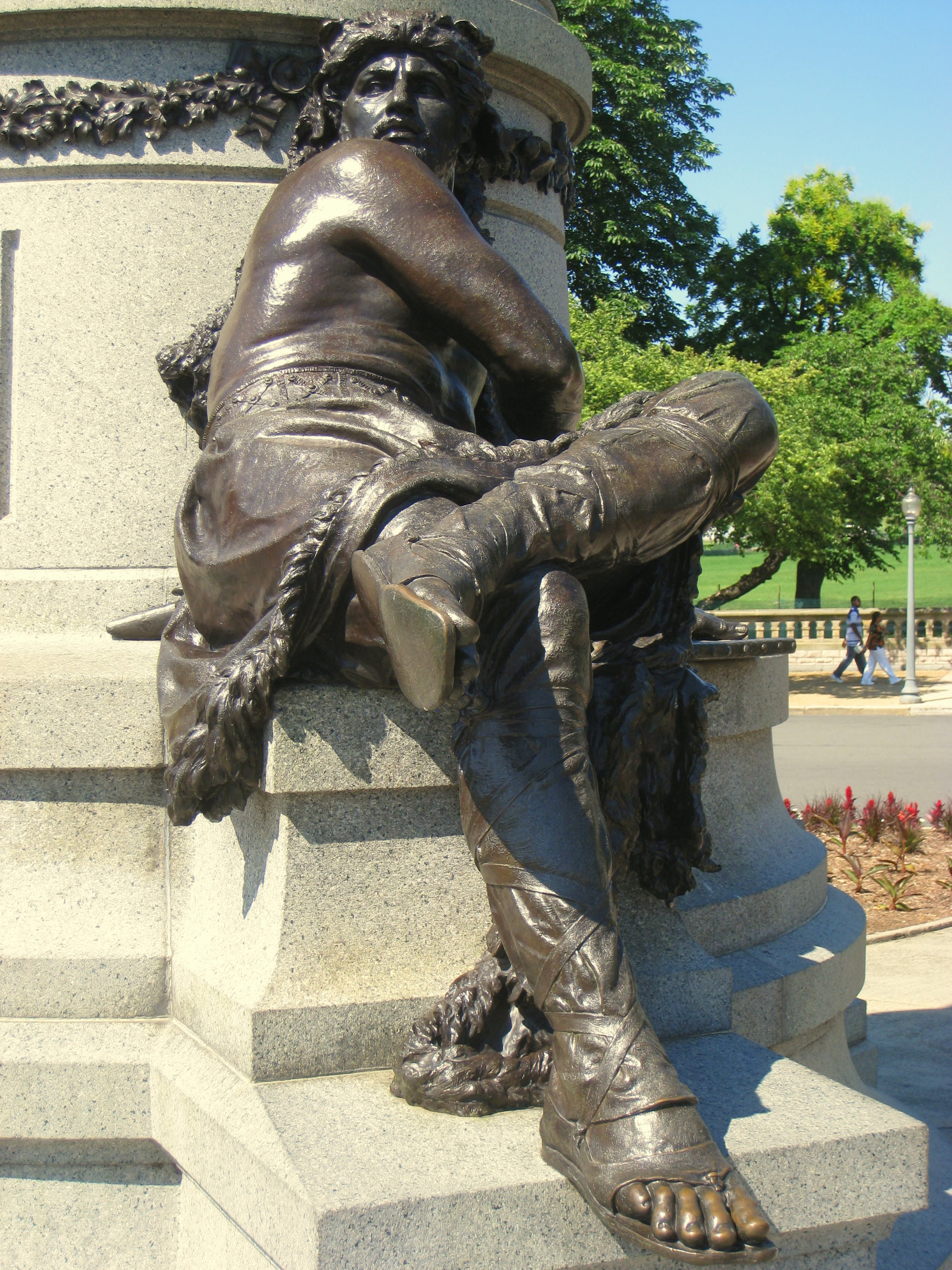
One of three sculptures on the pedestal

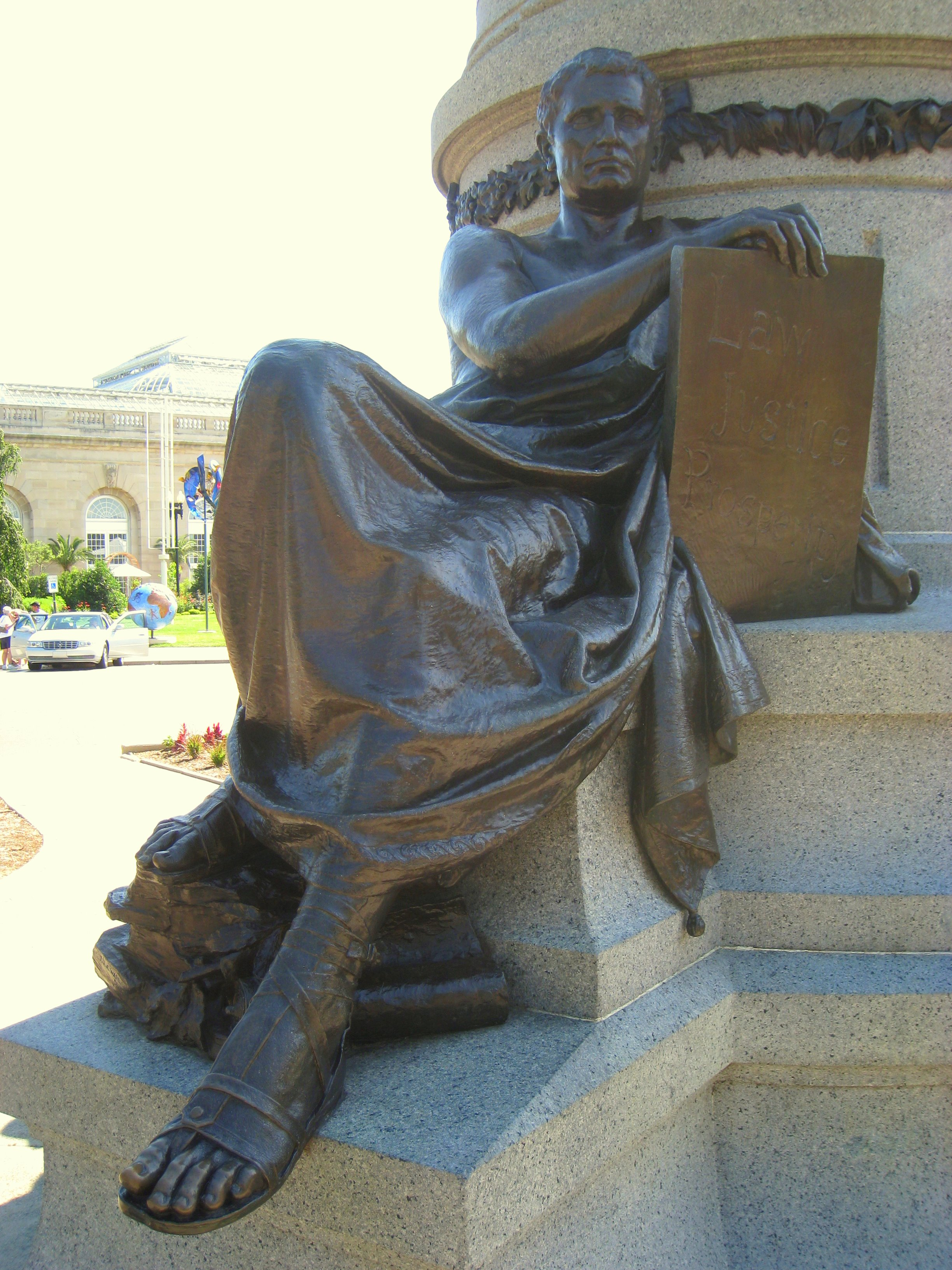
One of three sculptures on the pedestal

== See also ==
- List of memorials to James A. Garfield
- List of public art in Washington, D.C., Ward 6
- List of sculptures of presidents of the United States
- Presidential memorials in the United States
