= Garfield Park (Washington, D.C.) =

Park in Washington, D.C., U.S.

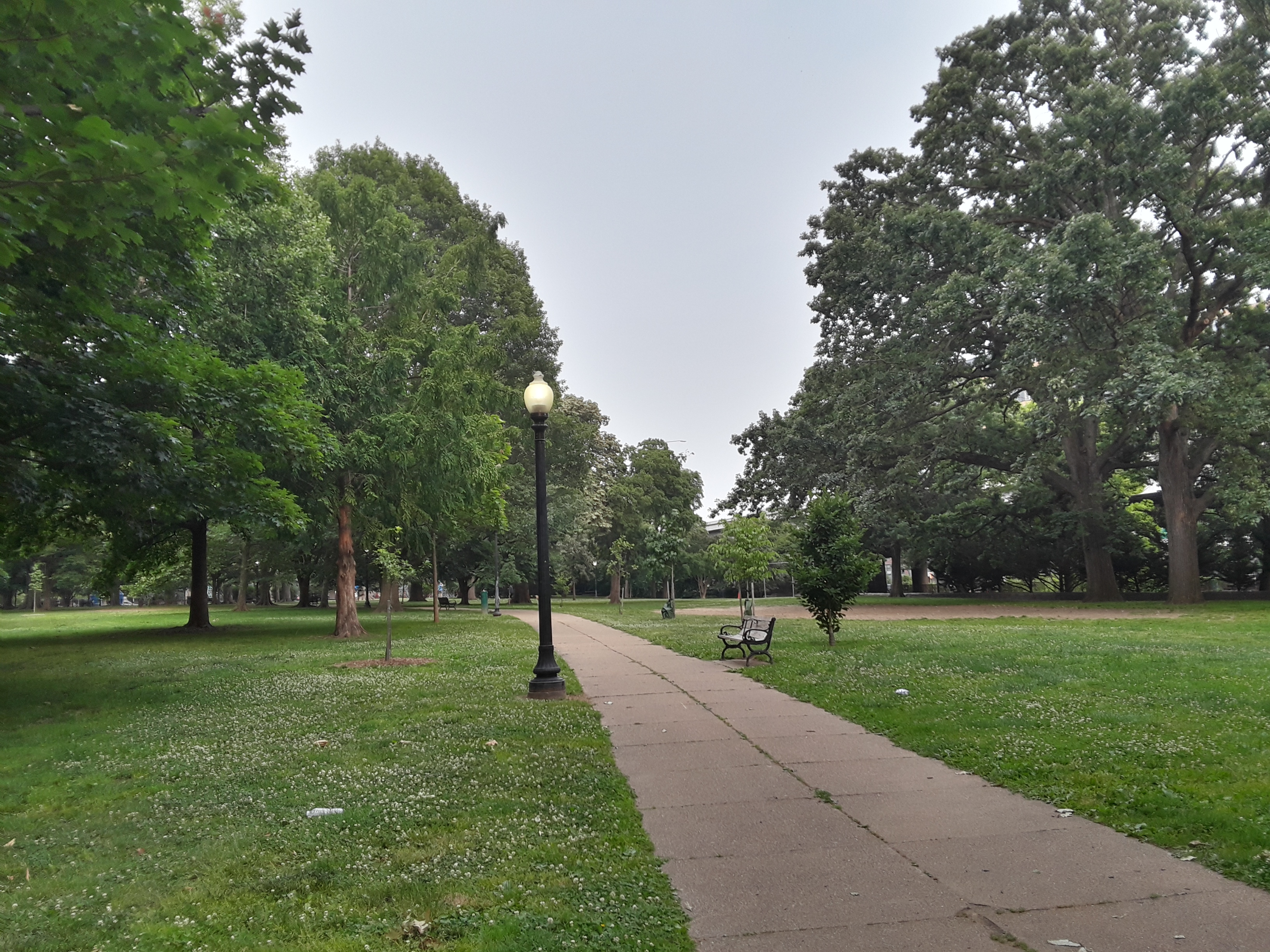
- In June 2023

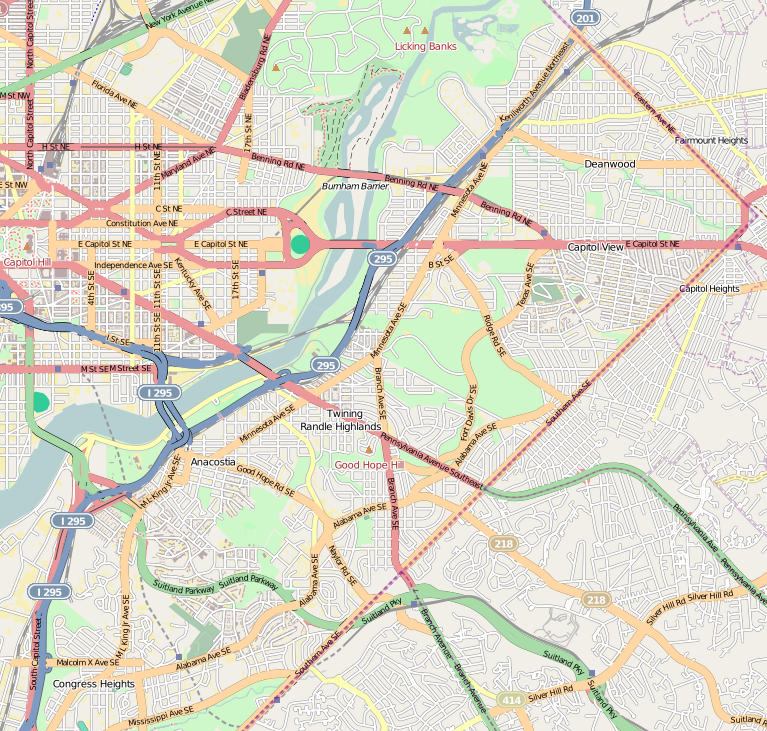
- Location within Washington, D.C.
- Location: Washington, D.C.
- Coordinates: 38°52′54″N 77°00′10″W
- Area: 7.12 acres (2.88 ha)
- Operator: DC Department of Parks and Recreation
- Website: dpr.dc.gov/page/local-parks

Garfield Park is a neighborhood park in Washington D.C. Named after American president James A. Garfield, it is located at the intersection of 2nd Street and G Street in the Capitol Hill neighborhood of Southeast, Washington, D.C. It is bounded by 3rd street on the east and New Jersey Avenue on the west. South Carolina Avenue and F Street bound it on the north, and its southern border is Interstate 695.

A large playground is located near its center, and the park also hosts a number of sport amenities such as tennis courts, a volleyball court, bocce courts, and a baseball backstop along with picnic tables and benches. The park is maintained by the DC Department of Parks and Recreation. It is categorized as a neighborhood park, providing an informal park setting for recreational purposes for the immediate neighborhood. It is one of the few L'Enfant Plan parks owned by the city of Washington, D.C. instead of the federal government.

== History ==
=== Early history ===
This open space was originally included in the 1791 urban plan for Washington, L'Enfant Plan. The site may have been selected by L'Enfant because it contained several natural springs, and he indicated that it should be the site for a grand cascade. It was to be the convergence of Virginia Avenue, South Carolina Avenue, and New Jersey Avenue, with the canal running along its western border, dividing into two branches just south of the park.

Andrew Ellicott made the open space larger on his plan and extended North Carolina Avenue south several blocks so that it would also radiate from the park. The space designed by Ellicott was included among the original seventeen appropriations purchased by the federal government for public use. The land was purchased by the U.S. government from Daniel Carroll of Duddington and designated as Reservation No. 17 or town House Square. The elegant, grand estate of Daniel Carroll, Duddington, faced the park from the North. This estate encompassed all of City Square No. 736 between First Street and Second Street and was constructed in 1793 with bricks from Carroll's own brickyard.

One paper claimed: Garfield Park, now one of the most beautiful parks in the city, was graded and to some extent improved in 1838 in connection with its use as a nursery for trees to ornament the public grounds and Pennsylvania Avenue. However, the Boschke map of 1857-1861 depicts the space as being entirely unimproved. Furthermore, a 1876 real estate atlas depicted the park as unimproved, showing New Jersey Avenue and Virginia Avenue continuing through it.

In 1850, citizens residing in the neighborhood petitioned Congress to fund improvements to the large open common. The portion of the park directly south of Duddington, between New Jersey Avenue and Second Street had a large supply of quarried rock that was used to make gravel to pave the streets of Washington, D.C. Through the mid-1800s, the quarry excavations left large holes in the park. In his "Letter from the Commissioner of Public Buildings Transmitting His Annual Report for 1850" to the U.S. Congress House of Representatives, Ignatius Mudd regarded those holes as an intolerable nuisance. Mudd recommended that area be graded and planted with trees and to protect its "copious springs," but to delay improvements to other areas of the park until the neighborhood population increased or at least until the adjacent streets were opened and graded.

Previously, the supervision of government areas had been under a commissioner of public buildings and grounds. In 1867, care and supervision of all reservations (original planned park lands) owned by the U.S. Federal Government was entrusted with Chief of Engineers of the United States Army for care and supervision. Appropriations for maintenance and improvement were documented in the Annual Report of the Secretary of War, Volume II. An officer in charge of public buildings and grounds, under his direction, was appointed to carry on this work. In 1898, Congress defined the jurisdiction of the municipal authorities and of the Chief of Engineers. Municipal authorities were assigned the streets and the parking along the streets. Chief of Engineers was assigned to all parks, reservations, triangles, and circles. In the wake of the Civil War, Congress apparently preferred to retain jurisdiction parks, etc., for the United States Government, rather than permit any municipal supervision that might conflict with the Government's needs. At the time, it was common knowledge that the point of view of the city authorities had conflicting goals with the established plans for the beautification of Washington, so that this separation of functions was likely retained for the greater protection of the parks and for their closer supervision.

=== 1880s Improvements ===
In the 1880s, the Office of Public Buildings and Grounds (OPB&G) took responsibility and management of embellishments of Reservation No. 17, beginning with restoring that land taken by several roadways now paved through the park.

In the Annual Report of the Secretary of War for the Year 1881, Volume II Part 3, OPB&G Colonel Almon Ferdinand Rockwell, a close, personal friend of both Presidents Abraham Lincoln and James A. Garfield, who was then charged with maintaining the Public Buildings and Grounds in the District of Columbia, entered that $20,000 was spent "for commencing improvement of reservation No. 17 and site of old canal northwest of same."

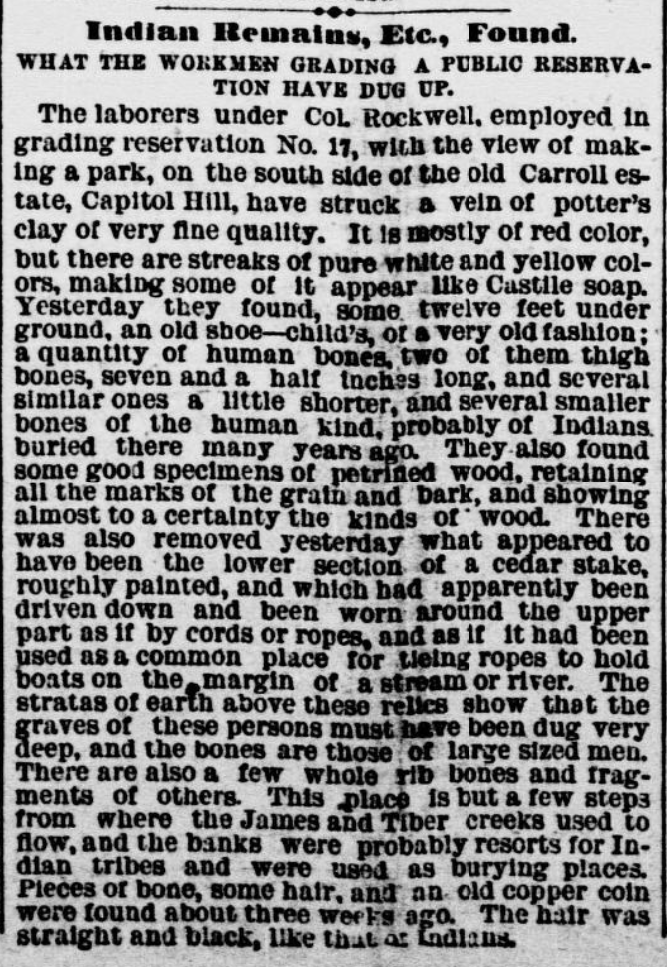
Evening Star, Aug. 22, 1883 p. 1 Indian [Native American] Remains, Etc., Found. What the Workmen Grading a Public Reservation Have Dug Up.

In an 1883 report, OPB&G Colonel Almon Ferdinand Rockwell described Reservation 17 as "located in a section of the city which, up to this date, has not been highly improved by private enterprise." Rockwell requested $20,000 for improvements to Reservation 17 "to make this park one of the principal resorts of the city, with extensive roadways for carriage drives and walks conveniently located for pedestrian passage." Rockwell wrote:

New Jersey Avenue, which cuts through this reservation, was paved with granite blocks some years since by the District's authorities. As the plan for the improvement of Reservation 17 provides for the incorporation in it of that portion of this avenue which traverses the grounds, the District Commissioners were granted permission, upon application, to take up and remove for use in District improvements such number of the granite blocks as they might wish, and some 38,000 blocks were accordingly so removed by them during the months of September and October last.

In 1883, Native American remains were found during grading excavations, directly south of the estate, which suggests that the location may have been the site of a Nacotchtank settlement.

By late 1885, the park was being referred to as Garfield Park in reports, such as Annual Report of the Secretary of War, Vol. II Pt. 1 dated Oct. 16, 1885, p. 374.

Improvement and Care of Public Buildings and Grounds in the District of Columbia. Officer in charge, Col. A. F. Rockwell, TU. S. Army, from July 1, 1884, to June 1, 1885; since that (late, Lient. Col. John M. Wilson, Corps of Engineers, Colonel, U. S. Army. In addition to the work performed for maintaining in good condition the improved public reservations, extensive improvements have been made at Folger Park, Washington Circle, Garfield Park, and the reservation on South Carolina avenue between Fourth and Sixth streets. An additional plant-house was constructed in the nursery south of the Monument Grounds.

Also, it is in Vol. II Pt. 3 of the Annual Report of the Secretary of War dated Dec. 07, 1885, p. 2507:

RESERVATION NO. 17-GARFIELD PARK. Operations were continued during the year -- grading, setting curb, laying out walks and roads, placing water-pipes in position, &c.; 5,500 cubic yards of soil, 1,200 cubic yards of gravel, and 400 cubic yards of earth were purchased and used in this park during the year; 4,818 linear feet of iron water pipe, from 1 to 4 inches in diameter, was placed in position and outlets introduced for twenty-three 11 inch hose-valves; 1,351 deciduous trees were removed from the Monument Nursery and planted in a temporary nursery at the reservation; they will be set out in the fall of 1885; about 1,000 feet of granite curbing was set on the boundaries of the reservation bordering E street, and 1,000 feet rejointed and parred for setting on the northwestern boundary lines of the park. During the present season operations will be continued; setting curb, laying brick sidewalks, laying out roads and paths, planting trees, etc.; about 3,000 yards of soil, 2,000 yards of gravel, and 150,000 bricks will be purchased for these purposes.

Duddington Manor, built by one of the city's original landowners, Daniel Carroll of Duddington, was razed in 1886 to be replaced by row houses. In 1886, the roadway entrance to the park on Second Street and F Street was paved with cobblestone; the surrounding sidewalks were paved with brick.

Between 1886 and 1892, OPB&G landscapers planted 6,500 trees in the park, laid paths along the lines of travel, and assigned a day and a night watchman to protect and to maintain the property. By 1887, $78,500 was invested in improvements to the park, the eastern section was nearly complete, more than 2,000 deciduous and evergreen trees and shrubs growing in the park were being cared for by OPB&G.

The gravel roads leading through the park to Virginia Avenue were used by heavy teams associated with nearby railroad, construction, and industry, forcing constant repair. In 1892, the park was damaged with the Grand Army of the Republic camped there for its 26th annual reunion, erecting barracks and a mess hall.

By 1901, the newly constructed Josiah Dent public elementary school adjacent to the park at South Carolina Avenue and Second Street, used the park as a playground for students.

In 1902, the Senate Report 'The Improvement of the Park System in the District of Columbia' listed Garfield Park as 'Between South Capitol Street and Third Street east, at intersection of New Jersey and Virginia Avenues, and being 23.9 acres in size.

In 1903, a portion of the park south of Virginia Avenue was granted by Congress to the Pennsylvania Railroad Company, which then erected an 8-foot-tall board fence to partition its land from the park. The change in grades imposed by the railroad construction forced a redesign of the park. In 1904, a tool house, workshop, and office room were framed in the northeast corner, while large public sewer was laid beneath the park, with temporary shed for storage of construction equipment.

In 1905, Congress transferred more than 6 acres to be used as a building site for heating, lighting, and a power plant for the Capitol, the Capitol Power Plant. Cast-iron posts from the post-and-chain fence were erected that year around the portion of the park bounded by New Jersey Avenue and First Street.

In 1913, the park was completely redesigned and included new lights.

In 1915, the Treasury Department let a contract for a Government Capitol Power Plant (December 24, 1915). A 1916 report states that in spite of the executive order (Nov. 28, 1913) this most important matter was not submitted to the National Fine Arts Commission until January 14, 1916, twenty-one days after contract was given. "The Commission strongly disapproves the plans of this structure, and views with grave anxiety the location of any such plant on this site." (January 26, 1916.) A resolution was introduced in the Senate, asking for a reconsideration of the power plant building and site. (S. J. Resolution 92, January 29, 1916.)

In 1916, Garfield Park is listed as being 9 acres in a report that also says that since 1867, not a single park has ever been placed by Congress under the exclusive charge of the municipal authorities for park purposes. Previous to 1867, the protection of park property was a duty of the municipal police, but, since main object of the municipal police is the detection and prevention of crime, protection of park property was often considered beneath their dignity; therefore, it was neglected. By 1916, the oversight gap was filled by the establishment a force of watchmen who were constantly on the alert to prevent trespass and other encroachment on the public grounds. Congress first funded then gave police powers to this force of watchmen which later organized as a distinct body, and by 1916 was uniformed and mounted on bicycles at Government expense. Because of other construction, a new lodge was erected. That 1026-foot lodge was erected to provide toilets for visitors and a 556-foot playground house was used by children in organized play.

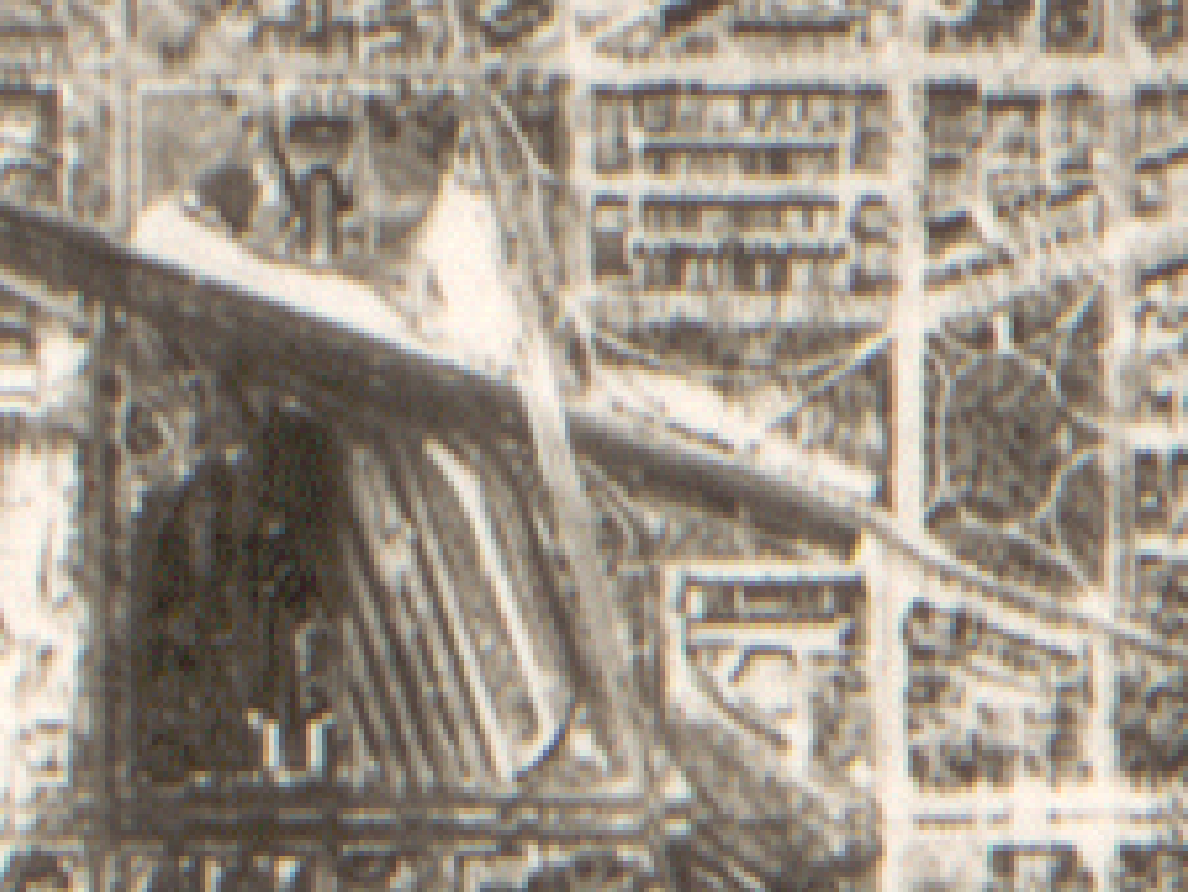
Garfield Park region of the April 13, 1928 United States Army. Air Corps. Aerial Photo Section No. 3. Photographic mosaic map, Washington, D.C. [Bolling Field, Washington, D.C.: The Section, 1928] Map. https://www.loc.gov/item/87693347/.

Neighborhood residents heavily used the park for rest and recreation in the first decades of the 20th century. The landscape plan installed in the 1920s included a large elliptical area at the east side which was referred to as the Concert Common since there were weekly band concerts during the summer. The park also boasted tennis courts, basketball courts, croquet, quoits, and volleyball court. In addition to the land activities, there were wading pools and sandboxes for children.

A 1924 blueprint of the site indicates that the construction for the concrete walks around the park used 1,640.8 linear feet, with a width of 5.68 feet, for a total of 7,640.6 square feet.

== Integration and modern day ==
Basketball great, Elgin Baylor, who lived a block away on Duddington Place, shot hoops in the park growing up. At one point, the Park had a wading pool, which consistent with the times was segregated.

In 1948, the park was part of a summer-long experiment on the racial integration of playgrounds in the District. Integration at Garfield Park was noted as being more difficult. At the time the neighborhood was approximately 25% white. The integration of the wading pool and baseball field was deemed unsuccessful due to strong opposition by white neighbors and was discontinued. The Supreme Court's decision, Bolling v. Sharpe, 347 U.S. 497 (1952), the landmark Supreme Court that desegregated public schools in the District of Columbia, ended all segregation within the city.

In 1969, 95,470 square feet on the south side were transferred to jurisdiction of the District of Columbia to construct the Southeast/Southwest Freeway, now called Interstate 695. When this part of the park was transferred to the District of Columbia for the construction of Interstate 695 in 1969. A basketball court, still accessible from the park, was built underneath the highway to mitigate the loss of park space. Also, traffic was closed to Second Street, which had always continued through the park. That section of Second Street roadbed was broken up and sodding was put down in its place.

Ownership of the remaining 7.1-acre park was transferred to the District of Columbia in 1972.

In April 2021, a community meeting was held by DPR to begin renovations to the park. A $1.3 million contract was awarded in June 2022 to Broughton Construction with Capitol Hill design firm Studio Laan, covering "Garfield Park proper" but not the DDOT-managed area under the freeway. DGS later terminated Broughton's contracts over performance and brought on a new design-build team — architect VIKA Capitol, contractor WKM Solutions. The park underwent renovations including new landscaping, site furnishings, playground equipment and surfacing at both play areas, lighting, ADA sidewalk/playground accessibility, tennis court surfacing, an erosion study, and volleyball court refurbishment. One of the two tennis courts was restriped for pickleball use. The construction kicked off June 2024 and was completed by May 2025.

In 2022, a separate DDOT project finalized design to connect nearby Canal Park to Garfield Park by a pedestrian path underneath the I-695 bridge. Phase 1 renovations in the amenity area beneath the overpass ran from August 2025 to January 2026, adding an ADA-compliant pedestrian path plus drainage and grading work. A DC Public Space Committee permit approved July 24, 2025 designated the dead-end block of Virginia Avenue SE for five pickleball courts, named for Robert M. Krughoff, who organized informal courts there starting July 2018. The courts opened by mid-2026; more than $100,000 was raised privately for surfacing, nets, and a storage container. Future construction planned include a skate park, basketball/futsal court, walkway, court dividers, lighting, and a retaining wall on the Garfield Park side.
