= James A. Garfield Monument (Philadelphia) =

Sculpture by Augustus Saint-Gaudens

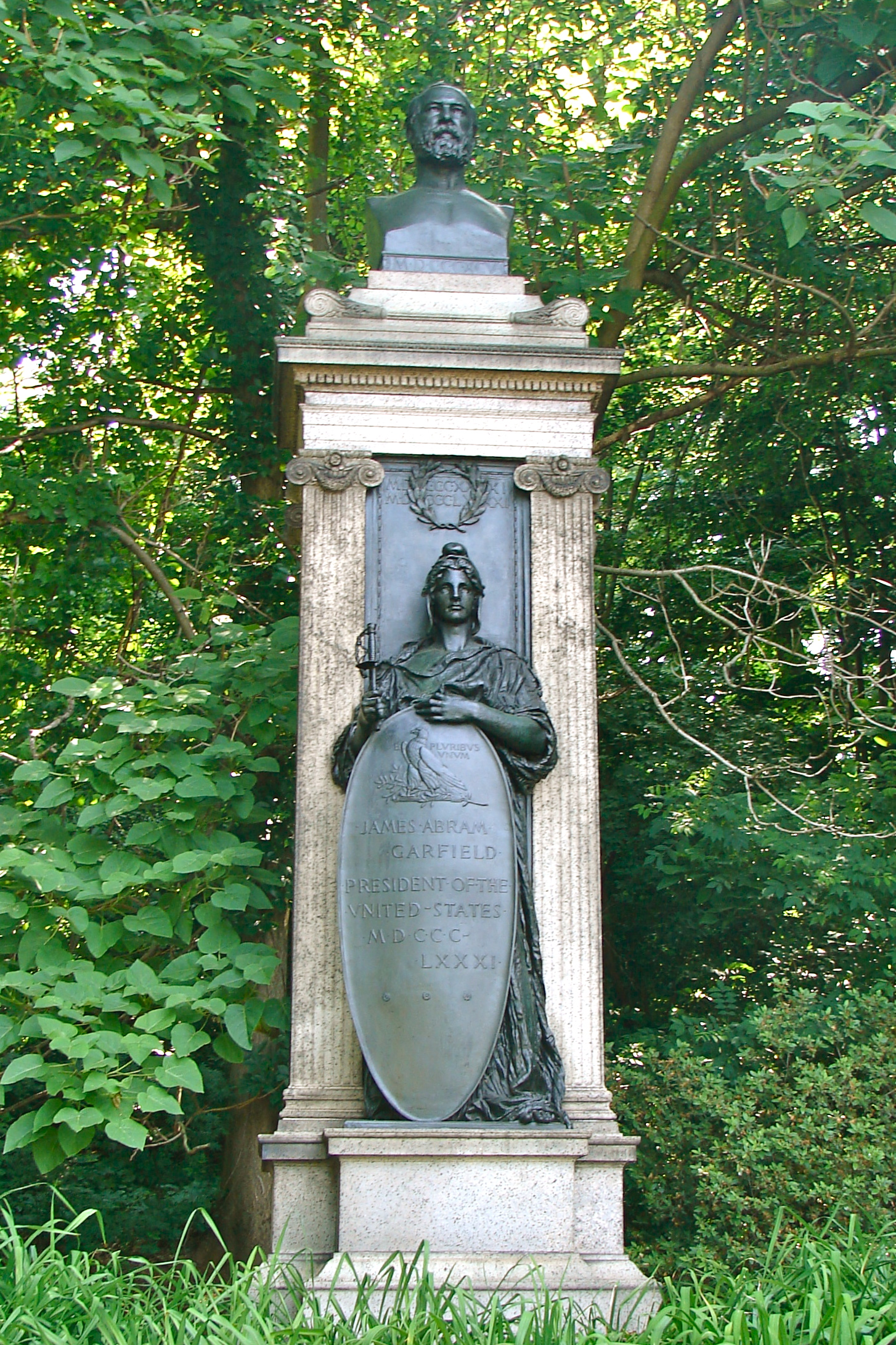
- The monument in 2011
- Interactive map of James A. Garfield Monument
- Location: Fairmount Park, Philadelphia, Pennsylvania, United States
- Coordinates: 39.9739°N 75.1905°W
- Designer: Sculptor: Augustus Saint-Gaudens; Architect: Stanford White
- Material: Sculpture: bronze Base: granite
- Height: Bust: 3.6 ft (1.1 m); Base: 17 ft (5.2 m)
- Beginning date: Commissioned: 1885; Cast: 1895
- Dedicated date: May 30, 1896
- Dedicated to: James A. Garfield

The James A. Garfield Monument is a monument honoring the 20th president of the United States in Philadelphia, Pennsylvania, United States. Sculptor Augustus Saint-Gaudens and architect Stanford White collaborated on the memorial, which was completed in 1896. It is located in Fairmount Park, along Kelly Drive, near the Girard Avenue Bridge.

== History ==
President Garfield was shot by an assassin in Washington, D.C., on July 2, 1881, and died of his wounds at a beach house in NJ on September 19. Later that year, the Fairmount Park Art Association (which became the Association for Public Art) initiated a fundraising campaign to erect a monument to him in Philadelphia. This was the second monument to be commissioned by the Association, which selected Augustus Saint-Gaudens in 1889 to design and create the work.

Cast in 1895, the monument was formally dedicated on May 30, 1896 by Mayor Charles F. Warwick. The dedication ceremony included a grand river fete with parades and a flotilla along the Schuylkill River.

The monument is one of many sculptures included in the Association for Public Art's Museum Without Walls: AUDIO interpretive audio program for Philadelphia's outdoor sculpture.

== 1896 description ==
The Garfield Memorial.
Between the pilasters of granite is the figure of a woman in bronze, of heroic size—typical of America—young, strong, dignified, holding in her hand the sword and palm, symbolic of Garfield's life, and bearing his name on the shield which she holds in front of her. Surmounting four square granite pilasters is the BUST of Garfield, of heroic size.
Pedestal.
The main pedestal is four feet wide, three feet deep, and seventeen feet high, resting upon a base projecting to carry the emblematic figure.
The main pedestal is flanked by four square Ionic pilasters. The material is pink Milford granite, and the style of the pedestal is pure Greek.

== Inscription ==
The inscriptions read:

A. ST GAUDENS '95
Cast by the Henry-Bonnard Bronze Co.,
NY 1895

(Front of shield held by figure of the Republic:)

E PLVRIBVS
VNVM
JAMES ABRAM
GARFIELD
PRESIDENT OF THE
VNITED STATES
MDCCC
LXXXI

(Base, above the Republic's head:)

MDCCCXXXI
MDCCCLXXXI

(Base, below bust:)

MDCCCXCB

The Fairmount Park Art Association plaque appears on the lower front of the sculpture's base.

== See also ==
- List of public art in Philadelphia
