= Charles Guiteau (song) =

Folk song about assassination of Garfield

"Charles Guiteau" (Roud 444, Laws E11) is a traditional folk song about the assassination of US President James A. Garfield by Charles J. Guiteau. It is based on another old ballad, "James A. Rogers". The song is told from the point of view of the assassin himself.

For a while, it was believed that Guiteau wrote the song himself, possibly because of the poem "I am Going to the Lordy", which Guiteau actually did write on the day of his execution.

It is not to be confused with another ballad about the assassination, "Mr. Garfield," which was popularized by Johnny Cash. Bascom Lamar Lunsford recorded both songs in 1949 for the Library of Congress.

== Recordings ==
- Norman Blake
- Bascom Lamar Lunsford on Songs and Ballads of American History and the Assassination of Presidents recorded 1949, released by Library of Congress 1952, re-released by Rounder 1998
- Kelly Harrell 1927 on Anthology of American Folk Music, Smithsonian Folkways 1997
- Ramblin' Jack Elliot circa 1955 on compilation Badmen, Heroes and Pirates, mono LP release (out of print)
- Tom Paley & Joe Locker on Sue Cow Argos 1969
- Dave Fredrickson and Crabgrass, circa 1960, on Arhoolie LP 4001, reissued on CD 518-B in conjunction with book Hear Me Howling! Blues, Ballads & Beyond, recorded by Chris Strachwitz with text by Adam Machado (El Cerrito, CA: Arhoolie Productions, 2010).

== See also ==
- Assassins (musical)
