= Assassins (musical) =

1990 musical by Stephen Sondheim

- Original Off-Broadway windowcard
- Music: Stephen Sondheim
- Lyrics: Stephen Sondheim
- Book: John Weidman
- Basis: Original concept by Charles Gilbert Jr.
- Premiere: December 18, 1990: Playwrights Horizons
- Productions: 1990 Off-Broadway; 1992 London; 2004 Broadway; 2014 Off-West End; 2021 Off-Broadway revival
- Awards: Tony Award for Best Revival of a Musical; Drama Desk Award for Outstanding Revival of a Musical

Assassins is a musical with music and lyrics by Stephen Sondheim and a book by John Weidman, based on an original concept by Charles Gilbert Jr.

Using the framing device of an all-American, yet sinister, carnival game, the semi-revue portrays a group of historical figures who attempted to assassinate presidents of the United States, and explores what their presence in American history says about the ideals of their country. The score is written to reflect both popular music of the various depicted eras and a broader tradition of "patriotic" American music.

The musical opened Off-Broadway in 1990 to many mixed and negative reviews, and ran for 73 performances; in 2004, the show was produced on Broadway to highly favorable notices and won five Tony Awards, including Best Revival of a Musical.

== Background and productions ==
=== Background ===
In 1979, as a panelist at producer Stuart Ostrow's Musical Theater Lab, Sondheim read a script by playwright Charles Gilbert Jr. entitled Assassins. Inspired by its title and use of quotations from various historical figures who had attempted to assassinate American Presidents, Sondheim asked Gilbert for permission to use his idea. Gilbert consented and offered to write the book, but Sondheim declined, having already had collaborator John Weidman in mind. Weidman had written the book for Pacific Overtures and would work with Sondheim again on Road Show.

Gilbert's original concept involved a fictional Vietnam War veteran who becomes an assassin and around this central narrative he had woven diary entries, poems, and newspaper reports of historical assassins. Sondheim and Weidman, having no interest in the fictional element, focused the musical solely on the historical figures. Five assassins appear in both versions: John Wilkes Booth, Charles J. Guiteau, Leon Czolgosz, Giuseppe Zangara, and Squeaky Fromme. The model for Gilbert's protagonist, Lee Harvey Oswald, also appears in the musical. The musical omits three assassins included in Gilbert’s script—Arthur Bremer (cut in rehearsals, but mentioned by name), Sirhan Sirhan (mentioned by name only), and John Schrank—and instead features Samuel Byck, Sara Jane Moore, and John Hinckley Jr., the last of whom had not yet attempted an assassination when Gilbert's version was written.

Aside from the title, Sondheim and Weidman also retained Gilbert's distinctive conceptual metaphor of the shooting gallery, presided over by a character called Fat Man (somewhat analogous to Weidman’s Proprietor) who is encouraging would-be assassins to "shoot the Prez and win a prize."

The first staged reading of the musical, at Playwrights Horizons on December 18, 1989, was directed by Jerry Zaks and featured Anthony Heald (Czolgosz), Paul McCrane (Hinckley), Michael Jeter (Zangara), Jonathan Hadary (Guiteau), Swoosie Kurtz (Fromme), Christine Baranski (Moore), Victor Garber (Booth), Kevin Anderson (Balladeer/Oswald) and Nathan Lane (Byck).

=== Productions ===
Assassins opened Off-Broadway at Playwrights Horizons on December 18, 1990, and closed on February 16, 1991, after 73 performances. Directed by Jerry Zaks the cast included Victor Garber, Terrence Mann, Patrick Cassidy, Debra Monk, Greg Germann, and Annie Golden. According to the Los Angeles Times, "The show has been sold out since previews began, reflecting the strong appeal of Sondheim's work among the theater crowd." Frank Rich in his review for The New York Times wrote that "Assassins will have to fire with sharper aim and fewer blanks if it is to shoot to kill." Only 140 subscribers could be seated for each performance. Billboard magazine noted that "Diehard Sondheim fans lined up outside the theater for up to 10 hours before curtain time, hoping to obtain cancellations, but only a few of them made it into the theater."

On October 29, 1992, Assassins opened in London at the Donmar Warehouse with direction by Sam Mendes and a cast that included Henry Goodman as Charles Guiteau and Louise Gold as Sara Jane Moore. The show ran for 76 performances, closing on January 9, 1993.

The first US regional production was mounted at Theatre Three in Dallas, July 15, 1992. The second was mounted by Signature Theatre in Arlington, Virginia in August 1992. The San Jose Civic Light Opera in San Jose, California, presented a production in 1993, which featured the world premiere of the 13-piece orchestration by Michael Starobin. The Los Angeles premiere opened in 1994 at the Los Angeles Theatre Center and included Patrick Cassidy (the original Balladeer) playing Booth, and Alan Safier as Guiteau.

The first Australian production opened in February 1995, presented by the Melbourne Theatre Company at the Fairfax Studio. Directed by Roger Hodgman, the cast featured John O'May, John McTernan and Bruce Myles.

Roundabout Theatre Company's Broadway production was originally scheduled for 2001 but was postponed to April 22, 2004, because the content was sensitive in light of the events of the September 11 attacks. After 101 performances at Studio 54, Assassins closed on July 18, 2004. Directed by Joe Mantello, with musical staging by Jonathan Butterell, Neil Patrick Harris starred in the roles of The Balladeer and Lee Harvey Oswald, with Marc Kudisch in an extended role as The Proprietor. Michael Cerveris played John Wilkes Booth, for which he received a Tony Award. The 2004 production was noted for a coup de théâtre: the Zapruder film of the assassination of John F. Kennedy projected onto Lee Harvey Oswald's T-shirt by projection designer Elaine J. McCarthy. On December 3, 2012, the Broadway cast reunited for a special benefit. Annaleigh Ashford stood in for Mary Catherine Garrison.

Other professional productions have included a 2006 production at Crucible Theatre, Sheffield, a 2008 production which ran from January 23 to February 2, 2008, at the Landor Theatre, London, The South African premiere opened in December 2008 as the inaugural production of the NewSpace Theatre in Cape Town. This production was directed by Fred Abrahamse with a South African cast including Marcel Meyer as John Wilkes Booth, Riaan Norval as Lee Harvey Oswald, David Dennis as Charles J. Guiteau and Anthea Thompson as Sara Jane Moore. A 2010 production in Toronto by BirdLand Theatre and Talk is Free Theatre won the Dora Mavor Moore Award for Outstanding Production in the Musical Theatre Division.

The Union Theatre, London produced Assassins in July 2010, and would received the Offie for Best (overall) Production. It was staged and directed by Michael Strassen. It attained Show of the Week and Critics choice in Time Out.

A new production of Assassins starring Catherine Tate as Sarah Jane Moore, Aaron Tveit as John Wilkes Booth, Mike McShane as Samuel Byck, Andy Nyman as Charles Guiteau, and Jamie Parker as the Balladeer opened on November 21, 2014, at the Menier Chocolate Factory in London and ran until March 7, 2015 directed by Jamie Lloyd.

Assassins was produced in the 2016-2017 season at Yale Repertory Theatre from March 17 to April 8, 2017. The Cast included Robert Lenzi as John Wilkes Booth, Stephen DeRosa as Charles Guiteau, and Julia Murney as Sara Jane Moore

Assassins was produced in the 2017 season of Encores! Off Center at the New York City Center from July 12–15 of that year, with a cast including Steven Pasquale as John Wilkes Booth, Victoria Clark as Sara Jane Moore, Alex Brightman as Giuseppe Zangara, and Shuler Hensley as Leon Czolgosz.

In October/November 2019 The Watermill Theatre Newbury and Nottingham Playhouse co-produced a new version in the UK, using a full cast of actor/musicians for the first time. The role of the Balladeer was switched to a female part for this production. A poignant moment was added at the end of the final scene, where a young child walks onto the stage from the audience, retrieves a gun from the vending machine (from which the main characters received their weapons at the start of the show) and fires the final gunshot out into the crowd.

John Doyle was to direct an Off-Broadway production at Classic Stage Company scheduled for 2020. On September 24, 2019, it was announced that the cast would include Judy Kuhn as Sara Jane Moore, Will Swenson as Charles Guiteau, Brandon Uranowitz as Leon Czolgosz, Wesley Taylor as Giuseppe Zangara, and Pasquale reprising his role as John Wilkes Booth. Other additions to the cast include Ethan Slater as Lee Harvey Oswald/The Balladeer and Tavi Gevinson as Lynette “Squeaky” Fromme. The show was delayed due to the COVID-19 pandemic. On September 9, 2021 it was announced that the production would begin performances on November 2, 2021 - January 8, 2022 with an official opening on November 14, 2021. And on November 9, 2021, it was announced that the production would extend through to January 29, 2022. The production ended up officially closing January 24, 2022 due to positive COVID-19 cases in the company. On March 18, 2022, a cast recording album of this production received a wide digital release, which featured all songs as well as an abridged version of the climactic scene between Booth and Oswald. In May 2022, there was a concert staging of this production performed at Broadway's Stephen Sondheim Theatre with the cast reuniting for the performance.

In June 2023, a revival played at the Chichester Festival Theatre in West Sussex, United Kingdom. The production starred Danny Mac as Booth, Luke Brady as Zangara, Peter Forbes as the Proprietor, Harry Hepple as Guiteau, Nick Holder as Byck, Charlotte Jaconelli as Goldman, and Jack Shalloo as Hinckley.

== Cast and characters ==
Role	Workshop	Off-Broadway	Off-West End	Broadway	Sheffield	Off-West End Revival	Encores!	Off-Broadway Revival
Role	1989	1990	1992	2004	2006	2014	2017	2021
John Wilkes Booth	Victor Garber	Victor Garber	David Firth	Michael Cerveris	Hadley Fraser	Aaron Tveit	Steven Pasquale	Steven Pasquale
Charles J. Guiteau	Jonathan Hadary	Jonathan Hadary	Henry Goodman	Denis O'Hare	Ian Bartholomew	Andy Nyman	John Ellison Conlee	Will Swenson
Leon Czolgosz	Anthony Heald	Terrence Mann	Jack Ellis	James Barbour	Billy Carter	David Seadon Young (credited as David Roberts)	Shuler Hensley	Brandon Uranowitz
Giuseppe Zangara	Michael Jeter	Eddie Korbich	Paul Harrhy	Jeffrey Kuhn	Richard Colvin	Stewart Clarke	Alex Brightman	Wesley Taylor
Samuel Byck	Nathan Lane	Lee Wilkof	Ciarán Hinds	Mario Cantone	Gerard Murphy	Mike McShane	Danny Wolohan	Andy Grotelueschen
Sara Jane Moore	Christine Baranski	Debra Monk	Louise Gold	Becky Ann Baker	Josie Walker	Catherine Tate	Victoria Clark	Judy Kuhn
Lynette Fromme	Swoosie Kurtz	Annie Golden	Catheryn Bradshaw	Mary Catherine Garrison	Penny Layden	Carly Bawden	Erin Markey	Tavi Gevinson
John Hinckley Jr.	Paul McCrane	Greg Germann	Michael Cantwell	Alexander Gemignani	James Gillan	Harry Morrison	Steven Boyer	Adam Chanler-Berat
The Balladeer	Kevin Anderson	Patrick Cassidy	Anthony Barclay	Neil Patrick Harris	Matt Rawle	Jamie Parker	Clifton Duncan	Ethan Slater
Lee Harvey Oswald	Kevin Anderson	Jace Alexander	Gareth Snook	Neil Patrick Harris	Matt Cross	Jamie Parker	Cory Michael Smith	Ethan Slater
The Proprietor	Tim Jerome	William Parry	Paul Bentley	Marc Kudisch	Dave Burrows	Simon Lipkin	Ethan Lipton	Eddie Cooper

=== Notable replacements ===
Off-Broadway: (1990–91)

- Charles Guiteau: Davis Gaines (u/s)
- Sara Jane Moore: Joy Franz (u/s)
- The Balladeer: Davis Gaines (u/s)

Reunion Benefit Concert (2012)

- Lynette Fromme: Annaleigh Ashford

Off-West End: (2014–15)

- John Wilkes Booth: Michael Xavier
- Sara Jane Moore: Anna Francolini

== Synopsis ==
This synopsis reflects the current licensed version of the show. The published script of the 1992 Off-Broadway production is slightly different.

The show opens in a fairground shooting gallery where human figures trundle past on a conveyor belt. One by one, a collection of misfits enters, where the Proprietor of the game entices them to play, promising that their problems will be solved by killing a president ("Everybody’s Got the Right"). Leon Czolgosz, John Hinckley, Charles Guiteau, Giuseppe Zangara, Samuel Byck, Lynette "Squeaky" Fromme, and Sara Jane Moore are given their guns one by one. John Wilkes Booth enters last and the Proprietor introduces him to the others as their pioneer before he begins distributing ammunition. The assassins take aim as "Hail to the Chief" heralds Abraham Lincoln's offstage arrival. Booth excuses himself, a shot rings out and Booth shouts, "Sic semper tyrannis!"

The Balladeer, a personification of the American Dream, appears and begins to tell Booth's story ("The Ballad of Booth") as the scene changes to Richard H. Garrett's barn in 1865. Booth, mudstained and with a broken leg, is attempting to write his reasons for killing Lincoln in his diary but cannot hold the pen. He forces his associate David Herold to write for him at gunpoint. As Booth dictates, blaming Lincoln for the Civil War and for destroying the South, the Balladeer interjects that Booth's motives really had more to do with his personal problems, much to Booth's annoyance. When a Union soldier calls for Booth's surrender, Herold abandons him and surrenders. In desperation, Booth throws the Balladeer his diary so that he can tell his story to the world. The Balladeer reads out Booth's justifications, and Booth laments that his act will not be enough to heal the country. As the Union soldiers set fire to the barn, Booth commits suicide, and the Balladeer concludes that Booth was a madman whose treacherous legacy only served as inspiration for other madmen. The Balladeer rips Booth's diary and burns the pages.

The Assassins gather in a bar. Guiteau toasts to the U.S. presidency, speaking of his ambition to become Ambassador to France. Hinckley accidentally breaks a bottle, and Czolgosz flies into a rage, describing the bottle factory he works in and how many men die or are injured just to make a bottle. Guiteau jokingly tells Czolgosz to find another job, and the two begin to argue about the American Dream, with Guiteau defending America and Czolgosz dismissing it as a lie. Czolgosz grabs a bottle, barely stopping himself from throwing it. Booth urges Czolgosz to take control of his fate by breaking a bottle himself, but Czolgosz cannot. Zangara complains about his stomach pains, and Booth suggests fixing them by shooting Franklin D. Roosevelt.

A radio broadcast, narrated by the Proprietor, describes Zangara's failed attempt to assassinate Roosevelt at Bayfront Park in Miami. He misses Roosevelt and accidentally kills Chicago Mayor Anton Cermak instead. Five bystanders are interviewed in turn, telling the audience their versions of the event; each is convinced that they personally saved the president ("How I Saved Roosevelt"). From an electric chair, Zangara sings his refusal to be afraid and that he did not care whom he killed as long as it was one of the men who control the money. Peeved that as an "American nothing" he has no photographers at his execution, Zangara is electrocuted as the bystanders preen for the cameras.

American anarchist Emma Goldman gives a lecture from offstage as Czolgosz listens, enraptured. He introduces himself to her and declares his love, but she tells him to redirect his passion to social justice. She gives him a leaflet that she tells him contains an idea that is "not mine alone, but mine". As she prepares to leave, Czolgosz offers to carry her bag, to which Goldman protests. Czolgosz, in his first display of assertiveness, still insists.

Fromme and Moore meet on a park bench and share a joint. Fromme speaks of the apocalyptic preachings of Charles Manson, remembering how they met and declaring herself his lover and slave. Juggling her purse, a can of Tab and a bucket of Kentucky Fried Chicken, Moore claims she is an informant for the FBI (or used to be), has been a CPA and had five husbands and three children. They connect over their shared hatred of their fathers, and using Colonel Sanders as a graven image, they give the bucket of chicken the evil eye and then shoot it while laughing. Moore realizes that she knew Manson in high school, and the women scream in delight over their memories of him.

Czolgosz reflects on how many men die just to make a gun. Booth, Guiteau and Moore enter one by one and join him in a barbershop quartet in which they honor a single gun's power to change the world ("The Gun Song"). Czolgosz decides to shoot the president.

Czolgosz arrives at the 1901 Pan-American Exposition where William McKinley is shaking visitors' hands. The Balladeer sings ("The Ballad of Czolgosz") as Czolgosz joins the line, and upon reaching McKinley, he shoots him.

Samuel Byck sits on a park bench. He talks into a tape recorder, preparing a message to Leonard Bernstein telling Bernstein he can save the world by writing more love songs, and explaining that he is going to change things by crashing a 747 into the White House and killing Richard Nixon. Then he accuses Bernstein of ignoring him, just like the other celebrities he has recorded tapes for, such as Hank Aaron and Jonas Salk. After flying into a rage, Byck stands up and angrily sings the chorus to "America" before storming offstage.

John Hinckley sits in his rumpus room playing a guitar. Lynette Fromme enters and asks him to play her a song, but he refuses. Fromme notices a picture of Jodie Foster, who Hinckley claims is his girlfriend. When Fromme realizes the picture is a publicity photo, she pulls out a picture of Charles Manson and mocks Hinckley for being in love with a woman he has never met, which makes him throw her out in a fit of rage. Alone, he swears that he will win Foster's love "with one brave, historic act" and sings a love song to her while Fromme individually does the same to Manson ("Unworthy of Your Love"). An image of Ronald Reagan appears on a wall in the back of the stage, and an enraged Hinckley shoots it over and over again, but the picture keeps reappearing. The Proprietor mocks Hinckley by quoting Reagan as Hinckley fires, missing each time.

Back at the Proprietor's shooting range, Charles Guiteau flirts with Sara Jane Moore while giving her marksmanship tips before trying to kiss her. When she rebuffs him, he becomes enraged and attacks her. Her gun goes off in his ear, and he backs off, angrily proclaiming that he will be the next ambassador to France. The scene changes to a train station, where Guiteau goes to meet James Garfield and James Blaine. He asks to be made Ambassador, but Garfield mockingly refuses, prompting Guiteau to shoot him.

Guiteau is arrested and sent to the gallows, where he recites a poem he wrote titled "I Am Going to the Lordy". The Balladeer sings about Guiteau's trial and sentencing while Guiteau merrily cakewalks up to the noose, getting more optimistic with each verse. Guiteau sings along with the Balladeer about Guiteau's optimism before he is hanged ("The Ballad of Guiteau").

Squeaky Fromme and Sara Jane Moore prepare to assassinate Gerald Ford. Moore has brought along her nine-year-old son and her dog (which she accidentally shoots), which causes an argument between the two women, who briefly turn on each other. Moore accidentally spills her gun's bullets just as President Ford enters the stage. Not recognizing him at first, the two women allow him to help them, but upon discovering who he is, Fromme tries to shoot him, but her gun jams. Having no other resource, Moore tries to throw her bullets at Ford.

Samuel Byck is driving to the airport to hijack a plane, which he plans to crash into the White House. Growing unhinged, he records a message addressed to Nixon, complaining about contemporary American life, how the public is constantly lied to, and announces that killing him is the only solution.

The assassins congregate in limbo to enumerate their reasons for taking action and lament not receiving any "prize" for their efforts. The Balladeer admonishes their violent methods and argues for the possibility of the American Dream. The Proprietor leads the assassins in a song for all Americans dispossessed by the Dream ("Another National Anthem"). Against his protests, the assassins force the Balladeer offstage.

On the sixth floor of the Texas School Book Depository, the ghosts of the assassins, led by Booth, appear before a suicidal Lee Harvey Oswald. They implore him not to become his own victim and to instead assassinate John F. Kennedy, thereby sharing his pain and disillusionment with the world. They tell Oswald that this act will empower the assassins of the future and revitalize the actions taken by assassins of the past. Finally moved by the idea that he has the power to unite the assassins, Oswald shoots ("November 22, 1963").

After the assassinations, various citizens recall what they were doing when they heard that the president had been killed, reflecting on their grief. ("Something Just Broke").

The assassins regroup once more at the shooting range, now with Oswald. They proudly reassert that "everybody's got the right to be happy" before loading and aiming their guns ("Everybody's Got the Right (Reprise)").

== Themes ==
=== Sacrificing for the greater good / fighting against political injustice ===
According to Valerie Lynn Schrader, out of the nine assassins in the musical, six of them (John Wilkes Booth, Giuseppe Zangara, Leon Czolgosz, Charles Guiteau, Lynette "Squeaky" Fromme, and Samuel Byck) are motivated to assassinate their targets due to what they view as "political injustice and sacrifice for the greater good," and among the six assassins, Booth and Czolgosz have been portrayed to have such motives as their primary reason for their assassination.

In the musical, John Wilkes Booth believes that his assassination on President Abraham Lincoln is for the greater good (and is an act of patriotism). The attribution of this motive to Booth is "supported historically: the Ford’s Theatre Museum notes that Booth was part of a conspiracy to assassinate President Lincoln, Vice President Andrew Johnson, and Secretary of State William H. Seward in order to put the Union in a state of disarray and anarchy." Raymond Knapp states that Booth's motivation is "conveyed musically, self-servingly by his own singing in a quasi-hymnic, sometimes inspirational style," based on the 1991 original Off-Broadway Version.

In the scene before "The Gun Song", the anarchist Emma Goldman inspires Leon Czolgosz to take action in light of his anarchist beliefs and the "societal injustice" that he has noticed. In "The Gun Song", Czolgosz has a "moody contemplation of how one gun connects backward to the many lifes it consumes in its manufacture," and later he claims that "[a] gun claims many men before it's done. Just one more," referring to his assassination target, President William McKinley. The political injustice in Czolgosz's timeline would be the "class inequalities in America."

=== Desiring attention ===
Many assassins in the musical have lines reflecting their need for attention, and according to Wang, "what unites each of the assassins is the desire for attention." In "How I Saved Roosevelt," Giuseppe Zangara is extremely angry about not having a photographer even at his execution: "and why there no photographers? For Zangara no photographers! Only capitalists get photographers!" Another assassin, Sara Jane Moore, "proclaims that one of her motives was 'so that her friends would know where [she] was coming from.'"

Lynette "Squeaky" Fromme and John Hinckley Jr. are described as a "loving couple" in the musical, but the love that they show is in order to try to draw attention from two different persons. Unlike some assassins such as Zangara whose goals might reflect many of the themes of the musical, these two assassins have only one motive - to get attention from the person they love (for Fromme, it is Charles Manson; for Hinckley, it is Jodie Foster). In the short monologue before the song "Unworthy of Your Love", Hinckley states that "[he] will win [Foster's] love, now and for all eternity."

=== Idealism and optimism ===
This theme is mainly represented by Charles Guiteau. His idealism and optimism might make audience members "feel more sympathy for Guiteau than for some of the other assassins." Throughout the musical, Guiteau has lines and lyrics which show his idealism and optimism towards his life and the world. The quartet "The Gun Song", which Guiteau participates in, and the song "The Ballad of Guiteau" both portray him as an optimist while others are depicted as dark and not so optimistic. For example, in "The Gun Song", Guiteau "waltzes in cheerfully, holding a gun up admiringly, and declares: 'What a wonder is a gun! What a versatile invention,'" while Czolgosz just states that "[he hates] this gun." Guiteau's idealism is delusional, an exuberant but transparently flimsy cover for decidedly more earthly and self-interested ambition, and when his desires are thwarted, he gets angry. For example, he angrily shouts to Moore that "[he wants a kiss]" after Moore has already turned him down, and he assassinates President Garfield when denied the ambassadorship to France. His idealism and optimism are shown even in his execution scene (in "The Ballad of Guiteau"): he believes that "[he] shall be remembered" for assassinating President Garfield.

=== Pain, desperation, and disillusionment ===
Pain and desperation are central to Zangara's character: he is portrayed as a poor immigrant who suffers a very strong stomachache. In "How I Saved Roosevelt", Zangara's stomach pain and his desperation about not being able to cure his stomachache turn into his anger and hatred towards the upper class. According to Schrader, the real-life Moore attempted her assassination due to political reasons, yet in the musical, she does so due to an entirely different one: she is so frustrated and desperate about "how to understand and express herself" that she takes "drastic action." On the other hand, Byck's assassination attempt on President Richard Nixon is also to "satisfy his personal frustrations." His solo scene, titled "Have It Your Way" in the 2004 Broadway cast recording, presents his pain and disillusionment through his words and emotional expressions.

Unlike all the other assassins in the musical, Lee Harvey Oswald is portrayed as a desperate man attempting to commit suicide and as the only assassin who had no intention of killing a president. In the scene corresponding to this (the original 1991 Off-Broadway version is called "November 22, 1963"), Booth, as the leader of all assassins, tries to convince Oswald to assassinate President John F. Kennedy instead of committing suicide using countless tactics, yet he has to rely on other assassins to ultimately convince Oswald to do so. Schrader argues that "audience members who have encountered depression may find a level of consubstantiality with [him], at least until he is convinced to commit murder."

=== Community ===
As Schrader states, "Mark Fulk and Angela Howard suggest that 'family' is Assassins' central metaphor, particularly noting that family is 'the central concept that binds the group of American assassins and would-be assassins.'"

In the scene "November 22, 1963", the assassins join together in order to persuade Oswald to assassinate President John F. Kennedy while assuring him that he can "connect" to the other assassins. In addition, the assassins interact with each other despite coming from different time periods, in the scene "Ladies and Gentlemen a Toast", the scene "I Am a Terrifying and Imposing Figure", and the songs "Everybody's Got the Right", "Another National Anthem", and "Everybody's Got the Right (Reprise)".

Comparing the 1991 original production with other later versions, there is one song later added the musical, "Something Just Broke". This song is an assassin-free one, where five bystanders mourn the assassinated Presidents. These bystanders have different occupations and are in different timelines, yet are brought together by the assassination tragedies, indicating a sense of community among them.

== Versions ==
The three versions of Assassins (original, London, and Broadway) are not identical, as some roles were combined, and the song "Something Just Broke" was new to the London production. In 1991, Theatre Communications Group published the libretto, which did not feature "Something Just Broke".

The current licensed version of the musical reflects the 2004 Broadway revival. Although the script does not combine The Balladeer and Oswald into a single role, many productions have followed the revival in doing so.

== Musical numbers ==
- "Everybody's Got The Right" – Proprietor and Assassins (save for Oswald)
- "The Ballad of Booth" – Balladeer and Booth
- "How I Saved Roosevelt" – Proprietor, Zangara and Ensemble
- "The Gun Song" – Czolgosz, Booth, Guiteau and Moore
- "The Ballad of Czolgosz" – Balladeer and Ensemble
- "Unworthy of Your Love" – Hinckley and Fromme
- "The Ballad of Guiteau" – Guiteau and Balladeer
- "Another National Anthem" – Balladeer and Assassins (save for Oswald)+
- "November 22, 1963" – Oswald and Assassins
- "Something Just Broke" – Ensemble ++
- "Everybody's Got The Right" (Reprise) – Assassins

Notes: + In the original production, the lead part among the Assassins for "Another National Anthem" is sung by Byck. However, in the revised 2004 score, the lead is sung by the Proprietor.

++Added for the 1992 London production

== Cultural impact ==
Sondheim said that he expected backlash from the public due to the content. "There are always people who think that certain subjects are not right for musicals...[w]e're not going to apologize for dealing with such a volatile subject. Nowadays, virtually everything goes," he told The New York Times. He later wrote in Look I Made a Hat: Collected Lyrics (1981–2011) that "Assassins has only one moment I'd like to improve... Otherwise, as far as I'm concerned, the show is perfect. Immodest that may sound, but I'm ready to argue it with anybody".

Assassins was featured in episode 6 of Netflix's The Politician. In the show, they are performing in a school production of the musical, which parallels events occurring in their own lives. The episode included a cover of "Unworthy of Your Love", sung by Ben Platt and Zoey Deutch.

In March 2025, a production of Assassins was canceled mid-run at Northwestern University in Evanston, Illinois due to student backlash over the use of the N-word by the character John Wilkes Booth. The student-run newspaper The Daily Northwestern featured the criticisms from some students who felt that usage of the word, whatever its context, was an unacceptable decision. The college-focused civil liberties group Foundation for Individual Rights and Expression categorized the campus outcry and eventual cancellation as deplatforming.

== Awards and nominations ==
=== Original Off-Broadway production ===
Year	Award	Category	Nominee	Result
1991	Drama Desk Awards	Outstanding Musical		Nominated
1991	Drama Desk Awards	Outstanding Featured Actor in a Musical	Lee Wilkof	Nominated
1991	Drama Desk Awards	Outstanding Director of a Musical	Jerry Zaks	Nominated
1991	Drama Desk Awards	Outstanding Music	Stephen Sondheim	Nominated
1991	Drama Desk Awards	Outstanding Lyrics	Stephen Sondheim	Nominated
1991	Drama Desk Awards	Outstanding Book of a Musical	John Weidman	Nominated
1991	Drama League Awards	Distinguished Achievement in Musical Theatre	Stephen Sondheim	Won

=== Original London production ===
Year	Award	Category	Nominee	Result
1992	Critics' Circle Theatre Award	Best Musical		Won
1993	1993 Laurence Olivier Awards	Best New Musical		Nominated
1993	1993 Laurence Olivier Awards	Best Actor in a Musical	Henry Goodman	Won
1993	1993 Laurence Olivier Awards	Best Director of a Musical	Sam Mendes	Nominated

=== Original Broadway production ===
Year	Award	Category	Nominee	Result
2004	Tony Awards	Best Revival of a Musical		Won
2004	Tony Awards	Best Featured Actor in a Musical	Michael Cerveris	Won
2004	Tony Awards	Best Featured Actor in a Musical	Denis O'Hare	Nominated
2004	Tony Awards	Best Direction of a Musical	Joe Mantello	Won
2004	Tony Awards	Best Orchestrations	Michael Starobin	Won
2004	Tony Awards	Best Scenic Design of a Musical	Robert Brill	Nominated
2004	Tony Awards	Best Lighting Design	Peggy Eisenhauer and Jules Fisher	Won
2004	Drama Desk Awards	Outstanding Revival of a Musical		Won
2004	Drama Desk Awards	Outstanding Featured Actor in a Musical	Marc Kudisch	Nominated
2004	Drama Desk Awards	Outstanding Director of a Musical	Joe Mantello	Nominated
2004	Drama Desk Awards	Outstanding Orchestrations	Michael Starobin	Nominated
2004	Drama Desk Awards	Outstanding Scenic Design of a Musical	Robert Brill	Nominated
2004	Drama Desk Awards	Outstanding Lighting Design	Peggy Eisenhauer and Jules Fisher	Won
2004	Drama Desk Awards	Outstanding Sound Design	Dan Moses Schreier	Won
2004	Drama League Awards	Distinguished Revival of a Musical		Won
2004	Outer Critics Circle Awards	Outstanding Revival of a Musical		Nominated
2004	Outer Critics Circle Awards	Outstanding Featured Actor in a Musical	Michael Cerveris	Won
2004	Outer Critics Circle Awards	Outstanding Lighting Design	Peggy Eisenhauer and Jules Fisher	Won
2004	Theatre World Award		Alexander Gemignani	Honouree

Although Assassins had not run on Broadway prior to 2004, the 1992 London production and 1991 Off-Broadway production led to a ruling by the Tony Awards Administration Committee that the musical is a revival instead of an original musical.

=== 2014 Off-West End production ===
Year	Award	Category	Nominee	Result
2015	Evening Standard Theatre Awards	Best Musical		Nominated
2015	Evening Standard Theatre Awards	Best Director	Jamie Lloyd	Nominated

=== 2021 Off-Broadway Revival ===
Year	Award	Category	Nominee	Result
2022	Lucille Lortel Awards	Outstanding Revival		Nominated
2022	Lucille Lortel Awards	Outstanding Featured Performer in a Musical	Will Swenson	Nominated
2022	Lucille Lortel Awards	Outstanding Featured Performer in a Musical	Ethan Slater	Nominated
2022	Lucille Lortel Awards	Outstanding Director	John Doyle	Nominated
2022	Drama Desk Awards			
2022	Drama Desk Awards	Outstanding Revival of a Musical		Nominated
2022	Drama Desk Awards	Outstanding Featured Actress in a Musical	Judy Kuhn	Nominated
2022	Drama Desk Awards	Outstanding Director of a Musical	John Doyle	Nominated
2022	Drama Desk Awards	Outstanding Orchestrations	Greg Jarrett	Nominated
2022	Drama League Awards	Outstanding Revival of a Musical		Nominated
2022	Drama League Awards	Outstanding Director of a Musical	John Doyle	Nominated
2022	Drama League Awards	Distinguished Performance Award	Will Swenson	Nominated
2022	Outer Critics Circle Awards	Outstanding Revival of a Musical (Broadway or Off-Broadway)		Nominated
2022	Outer Critics Circle Awards	Outstanding Featured Actor in a Musical	Steven Pasquale	Nominated
2022	Outer Critics Circle Awards	Outstanding Featured Actor in a Musical	Will Swenson	Nominated
2022	Outer Critics Circle Awards	Outstanding Featured Actress in a Musical	Judy Kuhn	Nominated
2022	Outer Critics Circle Awards	Outstanding Orchestrations	Greg Jarrett	Nominated
2022	Outer Critics Circle Awards	Outstanding Sound Design (Play or Musical)	Matt Stine and Sam Kusnetz	Nominated

== Recordings ==
Recordings of both the Off-Broadway production and the 2004 revival were released. The original Off-Broadway version lacks the song "Something Just Broke", which was added to the show for the subsequent London production. The 1990 recording does however include the full 11-minute spoken-word climactic scene "November 22, 1963". The 2004 Broadway recording adds "Something Just Broke" and several dialogue sections but only includes the second half of the "November 1963" scene.

While the original Off-Broadway production used just three musicians, the 1990 cast album was fully orchestrated by Michael Starobin, with 33 musicians directed by Paul Gemignani.

The 2021 Off-Broadway revival received its own cast recording on March 18, 2022, making it the third English language recording of the show. It includes the full score, and features the actor-musician cast members playing their respective instruments.
