= I Am Going to the Lordy =

Poem by Charles J. Guiteau

- by Charles J. Guiteau
- Media type: Spoken/recited
- Lines: Interminable (26 spoken before execution)

Full text
- I am going to the Lordy at Wikisource

"I Am Going to the Lordy", alternatively titled "Simplicity", is a poem written by Charles J. Guiteau, the assassin of U.S. President James A. Garfield. He wrote it on June 30, 1882, the morning of his execution. He recited it during his last words.

"I Am Going to the Lordy" was used as a base for the song "The Ballad of Guiteau" in the Stephen Sondheim musical Assassins, where Guiteau sings a version of the song while cakewalking up and down the scaffold at the gallows.

== Reading ==
On 30 June 1882, before his execution for the assassination of President James Garfield, Charles J. Guiteau read aloud Matthew 14:28–14:32, delivered his last prayer, then announced:

"I am now going to read some verses which are intended to indicate my feelings at the moment of leaving this world. If set to music they may be rendered very effective. The idea is that of a child babbling to his mamma and his papa. I wrote it this morning about ten o'clock."

After paraphrasing Matthew 18:3, Guiteau proceeded to sing the poem in a style described as both "sad and doleful" as well as "high pitched" and "childlike". Guiteau had requested an orchestra to play behind him as he recited his poem, but his request was denied. After completing the first verse in song, Guiteau stopped singing and chanted the rest. Multiple times during the reading, Guiteau's voice faltered and he would begin sobbing, even stopping to lay his head on the shoulder of the minister standing by him. Guiteau raised his voice higher into falsetto to deliver the final two lines of the poem. As the executioner fitted the hood over Guiteau's head and put the rope around his neck, he held onto the piece of paper on which he had written his poem. Guiteau then signaled to the executioner that he was ready to die by dropping the paper.

== Content ==
The poem is repetitive, containing numerous Hallelujahs and other glories to God. Guiteau describes himself as the savior of both his "party" (Republican party) and his "land" (United States), but laments that they have murdered him for it.

"I am going to the Lordy, I am so glad.
I am going to the Lordy, I am so glad.
I am going to the Lordy,
Glory hallelujah! Glory hallelujah!
I am going to the Lordy!

"I love the Lordy with all my soul,
Glory hallelujah!
And that is the reason I am going to the Lord.
Glory hallelujah! Glory hallelujah!
I am going to the Lord.

"I saved my party and my land,
Glory hallelujah!
But they have murdered me for it,
And that is the reason I am going to the Lordy.
Glory hallelujah! Glory hallelujah!
I am going to the Lordy!

"I wonder what I will do when I get to the Lordy,
I guess that I will weep no more
When I get to the Lordy!
Glory hallelujah!

"I wonder what I will see when I get to the Lordy,
I expect to see most splendid things,
Beyond all earthly conception,
When I am with the Lordy!
Glory hallelujah! Glory hallelujah!
I am with the Lord."

== Reception ==
As Guiteau recited the poem, the response of spectators was to "shout, hoot, curse, and boo". Some who observed Guiteau's behavior while he was alive speculated that he was a "hereditary degenerate," or insane; however, the jury at his trial did not accept an insanity defense. Reports describing "I Am Going to the Lordy" called it "pathetic."

== Appearance in media ==
"I Am Going to the Lordy" is occasionally confused with the folk song "Charles Guiteau", since both works are similar in content and style.

"I Am Going to the Lordy" is featured in the song "The Ballad of Guiteau" from the Stephen Sondheim musical Assassins, where Guiteau sings an exaggerated version of the poem more and more fervently while the Balladeer sings about Guiteau's life, trial, and execution. Guiteau's insanity is illustrated through the contrast of the "fervent yet hymn-like poem" and the styles of music in the song. Sondheim first learned of the poem from the short story by Charles Gilbert on which Assassins is based, stating that the use of the poem in the song was one of two times he had ever borrowed from another writer in his work, the other being William Shakespeare.

Two versions of "I Am Going to the Lordy" appear in the 2025 miniseries Death by Lightning. Guiteau recites part of the poem before he is hanged (to the tune of the hymn "Immortal, Invisible, God Only Wise"), and the credits of the final episode feature a song titled "Weep No More", which incorporates the poem into its lyrics.

== See also ==
- Charles Guiteau (song)
- Death poem
