= The Light of Things Hoped For =

Studio album by Brave Saint Saturn
- Released: March 25, 2003
- Recorded: One Way Studios in Concord, CA
- Genre: Astro rock, Christian rock
- Length: 49:52
- Label: Tooth & Nail
- Producer: Masaki; Reese Roper

Brave Saint Saturn chronology
So Far from Home (2000)	The Light of Things Hoped For (2003)	Anti-Meridian (2008)

The Light of Things Hoped For is the second album by Christian rock band Brave Saint Saturn, released in 2003 (see 2003 in music).

The album is described as "astro-rock" and tells a story dealing with many personal struggles of the band members.

== Concept ==
The Light of Things Hoped For chronicles the crew of the U.S.S. Gloria (Roper, Culp, Hoerig, Verdecchio) as they continue their study of the moons of Saturn. As the album begins, the crew has just received the command from Mission Control to return home. The mood quickly changes, however, as complications arise. Gases are emitted from the Gloria, sending the ship careening into the eclipse of Titan, Saturn's largest moon. Communications cut out, and all seems to be lost. The crew reflects on what had happened and what they had lost, drawing the comparison of being away from the light of Christ. The album ends in a series of radio transmissions between the Gloria and Mission Control, and the U.S.S. Gloria emerges from the shadow of Titan and into the light, once again drawing the comparison between the Sun and Christ and the light He brings.

== Reception ==
Professional ratings
Review scores
Source	Rating
Allmusic	2.5/5 stars
Jesus Freak Hideout	link
HM	(not rated)

HM gave the album a positive review, saying it has a more serious focus than the band's debut, and shows growth in vocal and musical depth as well. Allmusic called it "a universe of soaring vocal harmonies and sugary pop hooks", praising the use of sound samples and the absence of preaching in the lyrics.

== Controversy ==
Tooth and Nail edited two tracks on the album without the band's permission. On the song "Enamel" a record scratch covers the end of the line "When you hear this song, I hope it hurts like Hell." Edits on "Heart Still Beats" cover the word "pissed" and the line "Go to hell."

Unedited versions of both tracks have been leaked to the internet. If the CD is ordered from Brave Saint Saturn's online store, they will email the unedited songs to the purchaser.

== Track listing ==
1. "Prologue" (Reese Roper) – 1:12
2. "The Sun Also Rises" (Roper) – 3:15
3. "Binary" (Roper) – 3:54
4. "Mercury" (Saki) – 0:42
5. "Enamel" (Roper) – 3:32
6. "Anastasia" (Roper) – 4:18
7. "Titan" (Roper) – 3:35
8. "Gemini" (Saki) – 1:06
9. "Estrella" (Roper) – 4:37
10. "Heart Still Beats" (Dennis Culp) – 4:28
11. "Babies Breath" (Roper) – 4:07
12. "I Fell Away" (Roper) – 3:13
13. "Recall" (Culp) – 4:21
14. "Atropos" (Roper) – 1:08
15. "Daylight" (Roper) – 6:24
16. "Irides of M" (Hidden Track)

The song "Titan" is introduced by a clip of the computer WOPR asking "Shall we play a game?" from the film WarGames.

The song "Estrella" was written by Reese Roper in his basement about his 25-year-old friend, Matt Estrella, who suffered from Neurofibromatosis 2 and died a year before the album came out.

== Personnel ==
- Dennis Culp - bass, electric guitar, keyboard, background vocals, narrator, vox organ
- Dave Fredrickson - saw
- Keith Hoerig - bass
- Justin McRoberts - background vocals, voices
- Reese Roper - piano, electric guitar, acoustic guitar, keyboard, vox organ, lead vocals
- Monica Smith - background vocals
- Andrew "Chaka" Verdecchio - drums
- Masaki Liu - additional electric guitar, additional acoustic guitar, violin
- Jen Hollingsworth - narrator
- Vinnie Angello - percussion
- Phil Bennet - wurlitzer, keys

== Production ==
- Producers: Masaki and Reese Roper
- Executive producers: Brandon Ebel, Tyson Paoletti
- Programming: Dennis Culp, Reese Roper
- Layout design: Aaron James
- Artwork: Aaron James
- Illustrations: Reese Roper
- Photography: Melinda Culp
