= SS Narragansett =

American paddle-steamer

Coordinates: 41.2525°N 72.3449°W

The SS Narragansett was a passenger paddle steamer of the Stonington Line that burned and sank on June 11, 1880, after a collision with her sister ship the SS Stonington in Long Island Sound.

The Narragansett had taken on approximately 300 passengers at the North River Pier at Jay St. in New York City at 5:00 pm. Later that evening, at around 11:30 pm, in heavy fog, she collided with the Stonington near the mouth of the Connecticut River. The Stonington was damaged, but was able to return to a port and took no casualties. The Narragansett had a huge gash in the side of her hull, caught fire and burned rapidly. Many of the passengers asleep in their staterooms were unable to escape.

Significant controversy followed the collision, as the captains of the two ships gave different accounts of the accident and the events leading up to it, and the crew of the Narragansett faced accusations of neglecting its duty. Approximately 50 passengers and at least five crewmen lost their lives on the Narragansett.

== Historical note ==
One of the passengers on the Stonington was Charles J. Guiteau who, just over a year later, assassinated President James A. Garfield. Guiteau was on deck at the time of the collision, and afterwards believed that he had been miraculously spared to punish Garfield.

One of the passengers on the Narragansett was John Reilly of the Cincinnati Stars, who was en-route to Providence, R.I. to meet up with his team. After the collision, Reilly put a life preserver on and jumped overboard. He was in the water for over an hour.
