= BirdLand Theatre =

BirdLand Theatre is a non-profit performing arts company located in downtown Toronto, Ontario. It was founded in 2003 by Artistic Producer Zorana Kydd. BirdLand Theatre concentrates on contemporary plays and the development of new works with focus on humanity and the human condition in the urban setting.

In 2006, the company won 5 Dora Mavor Moore Awards for The Last Days of Judas Iscariot by Stephen Adly Guirgis for: Outstanding Production, Outstanding Direction, Outstanding Performance by a Female, Outstanding Performance by a Male and Outstanding Lighting Design.
