= Charles J. Guiteau =

Assassin of James A. Garfield (1841–1882)

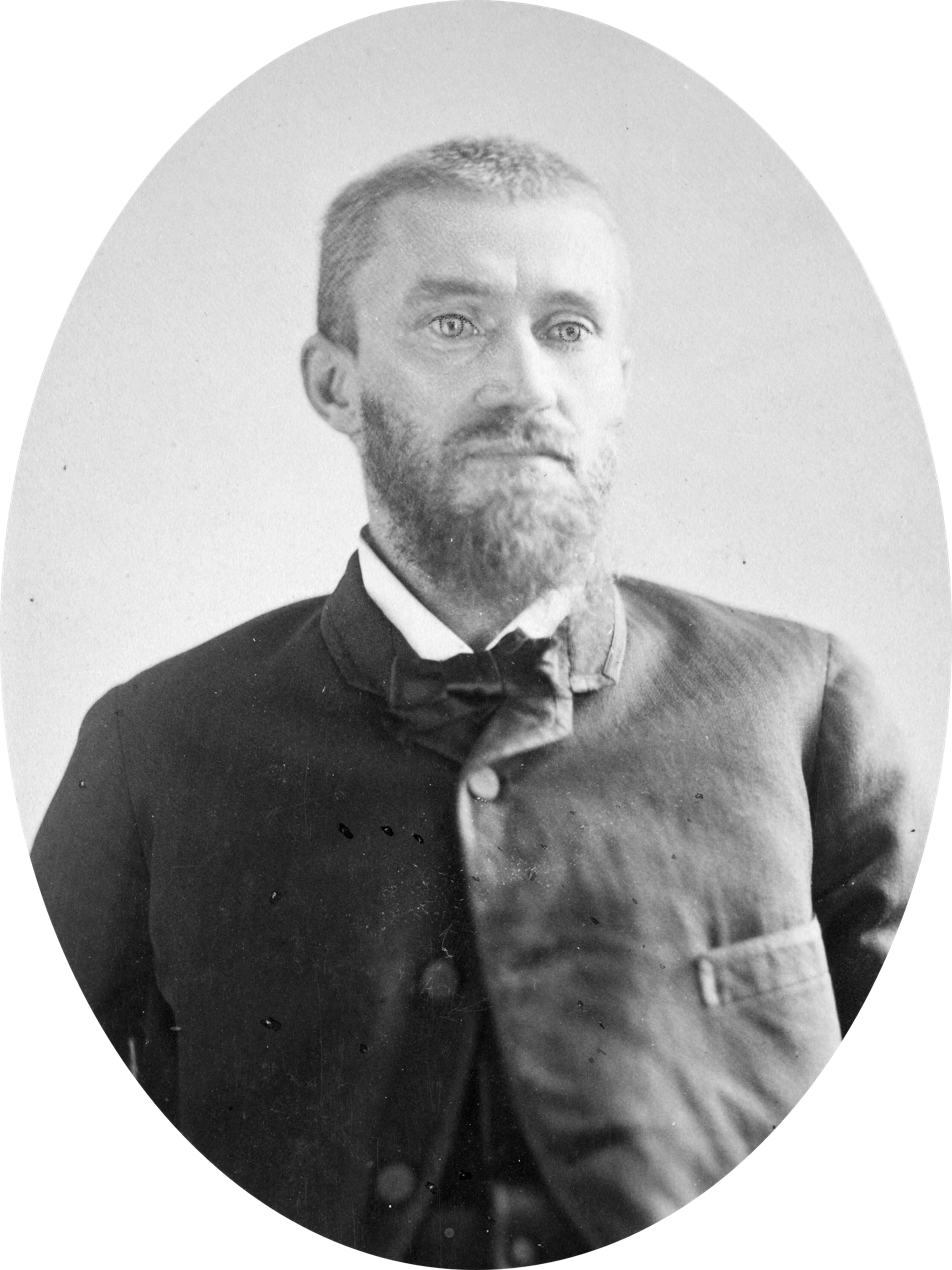
- Portrait by C. M. Bell, 1881
- Born: Charles Julius Guiteau; September 8, 1841; Freeport, Illinois, U.S.
- Died: June 30, 1882 (aged 40); D.C. Jail, Washington, D.C., U.S.
- Political party: Liberal Republican (1872); Republican (Stalwart faction, 1880–1882)
- Spouse: Annie Bunn (m. 1869; div. 1874)
- Status: Executed by hanging
- Motive: Mental illness; Retribution for perceived failure to reward campaign support; Desire for Chester A. Arthur to assume the presidency
- Conviction: First degree murder
- Penalty: Death

Details
- Victims: James A. Garfield
- Date: July 2, 1881 (died September 19, 1881)
- Locations: Baltimore and Potomac Railroad Station, Washington, D.C., U.S.

Charles Julius Guiteau (/ɡɪˈtoʊ/ ghih-TOH; September 8, 1841 – June 30, 1882) was an American office seeker and murderer who assassinated the 20th president of the United States, James A. Garfield, in 1881. A failed lawyer suffering from mental illness, Guiteau delusionally believed he had played a major role in Garfield's election victory, for which he should have been rewarded with a consulship. Guiteau felt frustrated and offended by the Garfield administration's rejections of his applications to serve in Vienna or Paris to such a degree that he shot Garfield in Washington, D.C., on July 2, 1881. Garfield died on September 19 from infections related to the wounds. Caught immediately after shooting Garfield, Guiteau was tried, convicted, and publicly executed by hanging on June 30, 1882.

== Early life and education ==
Guiteau was born in Freeport, Illinois, the fourth of six children of Jane August (née Howe) and Luther Wilson Guiteau, whose family was of French Huguenot ancestry. His mother died in 1848, and in 1850, Guiteau moved with his family to Ulao, Wisconsin (near current-day Grafton), where he lived until 1855. Soon after, Guiteau and his father moved back to Freeport. As a child, Guiteau was slow to learn, and his father was known to beat him for misspelling or mispronouncing words, or for failing to adhere to Luther Guiteau's strict religious standards.

In 1860, Guiteau inherited $1,000 (equivalent to $36,000 in 2025) from his grandfather and planned to attend the University of Michigan, but he failed the entrance examinations because of inadequate academic preparation. He crammed in French and algebra at Ann Arbor High School in Ann Arbor, Michigan, where he received numerous letters from his father that extolled the Oneida Community, the utopian religious sect in Oneida, New York, with which Guiteau's father had a close affiliation. In June 1860, Guiteau quit school and joined the Oneida Community. According to Brian Resnick of The Atlantic, the younger Guiteau "worshiped" the group's founder, John Humphrey Noyes, with Guiteau once writing that he had "perfect, entire and absolute confidence in [Noyes] in all things."

During the American Civil War, the Oneida Community was so remote that its male members were not required to register for the draft, so Guiteau was not conscripted, nor did he volunteer to enlist, despite being of military age. Despite the Oneida Community operating under the concept of free love, Guiteau was generally rejected during his time there, and the women turned his name into a play on words to create the nickname "Charles Gitout." Guiteau left the community twice; the first time, he went to Hoboken, New Jersey, and attempted to start The Daily Theocrat, a newspaper based on the Oneida religion. This failed, and Guiteau returned to Oneida, only to leave again and file lawsuits against Noyes, in which he demanded payment for the work he had supposedly performed on behalf of the Oneida Community. Guiteau's embarrassed father wrote letters in support of Noyes, who considered Guiteau irresponsible and insane.

== Early career ==
Guiteau had a checkered career that resulted in negative publicity and brushes with the law; newspaper notices in 1868 warned readers that he was falsely claiming to be an advertising agent for the New-York Tribune. He later worked as a clerk at the Chicago law firm of Joseph S. Reynolds, and in August 1868, passed a cursory examination to attain admission to the bar. (Note: State's Attorney Charles H. Reed asked Guiteau three questions, two of which he answered correctly.) He was not successful as a lawyer; he argued only one case in court, and his client was convicted. In 1869, Guiteau met and married librarian Annie Bunn. The bulk of his legal business was in bill collecting; she later detailed for the publishers of a Guiteau biography how he kept disproportionate amounts from his collections, and rarely gave any money to his clients.

Guiteau lost his office furniture and a law library in 1871's Great Chicago Fire. In 1872, Guiteau and his wife moved to New York City, one step ahead of bill collectors and dissatisfied clients. Guiteau took an interest in politics and identified with the Liberal Republican Party. In the 1872 presidential election, he supported Horace Greeley, the Liberal Republican and Democratic candidate, against incumbent Republican Ulysses S. Grant. Guiteau prepared a disorganized speech in support of Greeley, which he delivered once. Greeley was badly defeated, but during the campaign, Guiteau became convinced that if Greeley won, he would appoint Guiteau as minister (ambassador) to Chile. Guiteau was physically abusive to his wife; when she wanted a divorce in 1873, Guiteau obliged by having sex with a prostitute, who then testified to his infidelity. The divorce was granted in April 1874.

In July 1874, The New York Herald accused Guiteau of fraud; engaged to collect a $350 debt, he reportedly agreed to accept $175 from the debtor, which he kept. When the client objected, Guiteau argued that attorneys usually kept fifty percent of what they collected, and the $175 he had obtained represented his fifty percent of the $350 debt. News accounts of this incident caused Guiteau to sue Herald publisher James Gordon Bennett Jr. for libel; after requesting $100,000, he offered to settle for $25,000, which Bennett rejected. The case ended in October 1876, when trial judge George C. Barrett required Guiteau to post a bond to guarantee court costs, which Guiteau was unable to do.

Turning to authorship, Guiteau published a book on religion called The Truth, which was almost entirely plagiarized from the work of Noyes. In early 1875, Guiteau attempted to establish a law practice in Toulon, Illinois, but he departed after about six weeks, trailed by unpaid bills and accusations of theft. By late 1875, Guiteau's father had become convinced that his son was possessed by Satan. Conversely, Guiteau himself became increasingly convinced that his actions were divinely inspired, and that his destiny was to "preach a new Gospel" like Paul the Apostle. In July 1877, he was arrested for embezzlement, accused of collecting over $3,000 on accounts due for several Chicago businesses and keeping the money for himself.

After Guiteau's release from the Chicago jail, he began to wander from town to town speaking and preaching, and he was arrested again in September 1877, accused of failing to pay for his room and board while in Ann Arbor to give a lecture. Locations where Guiteau spoke included Boston and Springfield in Massachusetts, Providence in Rhode Island, and Madison and Beloit in Wisconsin. Other locations included Buffalo, New York, Jersey City, New Jersey, Philadelphia, Davenport, Iowa, and Washington, D.C. His lectures were often sparsely attended and negatively reviewed. They also generated little income; news reports after his visits frequently stated that he had absconded after failing to pay for advertising, food, and lodging.

== 1880 presidential campaign ==
Guiteau spent the first half of 1880 in Boston, which he left owing money and under suspicion of theft. On June 11, 1880, Guiteau was a passenger aboard SS Stonington when it collided with SS Narragansett at night in heavy fog, near the mouth of the Connecticut River. Stonington was able to return to port, but Narragansett burned to the waterline and sank with the loss of about 55 lives. Although neither Guiteau nor his fellow Stonington passengers were injured, the incident left Guiteau believing he had been spared for a higher purpose.

After the ship collision, Guiteau's interest turned again to politics. During the 1880 presidential campaign, the Republican Party was largely split into the Stalwart faction, led by Roscoe Conkling, who supported Grant for a non-consecutive third term, and the Half-Breeds, who supported James G. Blaine. Guiteau supported the Stalwarts and wrote a speech called "Grant against Hancock," which he quickly revised to "Garfield against Hancock," after dark horse candidate Garfield (not affiliated with either faction) won the nomination. Ultimately, Guiteau changed little more in the text than switching Grant's name to Garfield's. The speech was delivered twice at most, and printed copies were passed out to members of the Republican National Committee at their summer 1880 meeting in New York.

Guiteau was a campaign hanger-on; he occasionally appeared briefly as one of several speakers at minor Republican rallies, and was among those who left calling cards for Grant when Grant visited New York City in October. Garfield won a narrow victory over Democrat Winfield Scott Hancock that November. Despite his peripheral role, Guiteau believed himself to be largely responsible for Garfield's win, and insisted that he should be awarded a consulship for his supposedly vital assistance—first asking for Vienna, then deciding that he would rather have the one in Paris. (Guiteau later claimed that he had given up his ambitions for the Austrian consulship upon learning that Garfield had named William Walter Phelps to the position.)

By the early days of Garfield's administration, which commenced in March 1881, Guiteau was living in Washington, D.C., destitute and forced to sneak between rooming houses without paying for his lodging and meals, and to walk around the cold, snowy city in a threadbare suit, without a coat, hat, or boots. Guiteau spent his days in hotel lobbies reading discarded newspapers to keep track of the schedules of Garfield and his cabinet, and making use of the hotels' complimentary stationery to write them letters pressing his claim for a consulship. As one of many job seekers who lined up every day to see Garfield and his cabinet secretaries in person, Guiteau’s requests and numerous letters to the president and his staff were continually rejected. In the spring, Guiteau was still in Washington, and on May 14, 1881, he once more encountered Blaine, now Secretary of State, and inquired about a consular appointment; an exasperated Blaine finally snapped, "Never speak to me again on the Paris consulship as long as you live!" Garfield had already appointed Levi Parsons Morton as his French envoy on March 21, 1881, nearly two months prior.

== Assassination of Garfield ==
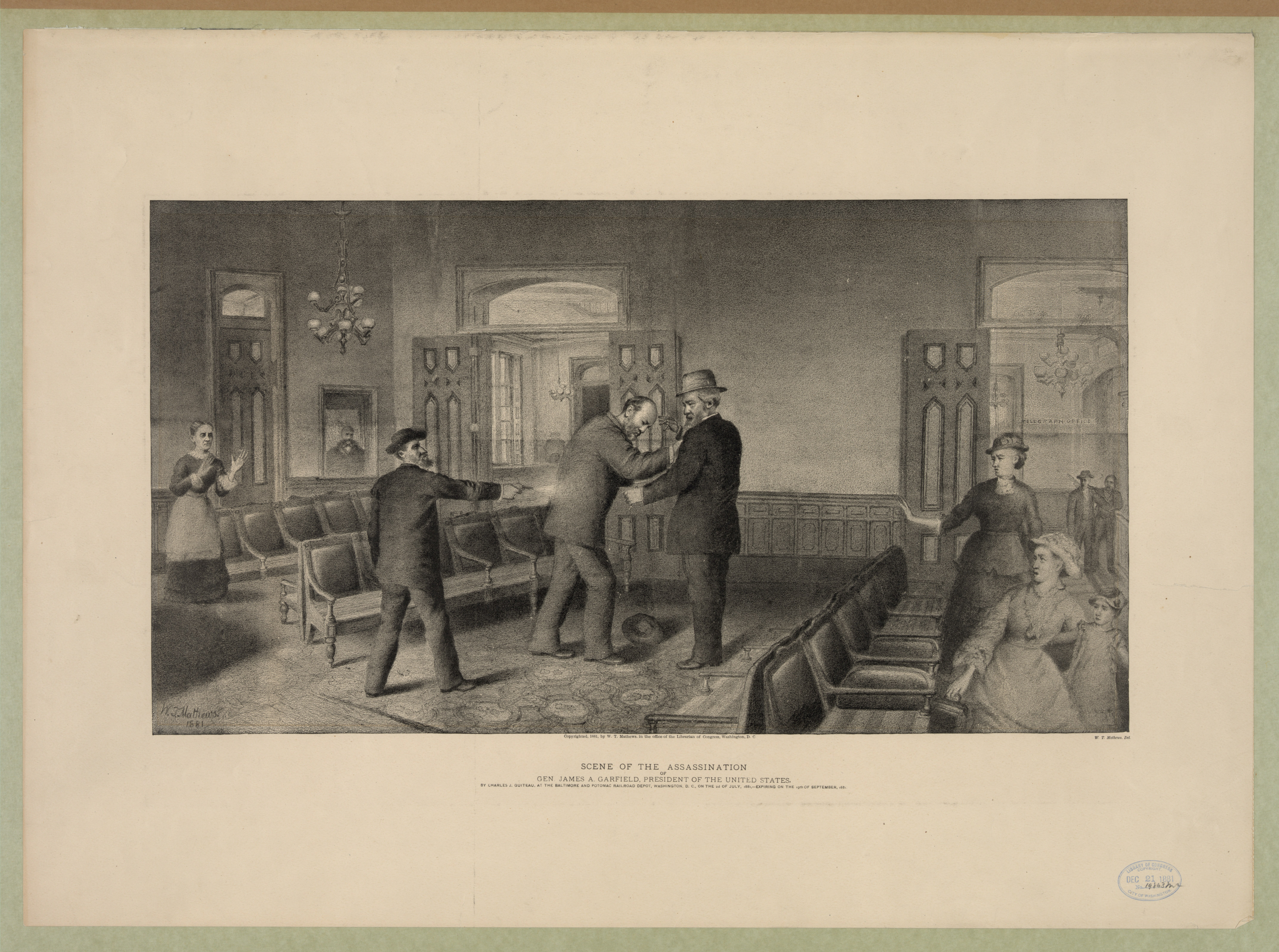
Contemporary illustration of Guiteau shooting Garfield

Guiteau considered himself a loyal Republican, and convinced himself that his work for the party had been critical to Garfield's election to the presidency. Later, Guiteau resolved that Garfield was going to destroy the Republican Party by abolishing the patronage system. Distraught after his final encounter with Blaine, Guiteau decided the only solution was to remove Garfield and elevate Vice President Chester A. Arthur, an acolyte of Senator Roscoe Conkling, the Stalwart leader who managed Grant's 1880 campaign, and who was not on friendly terms with Garfield.

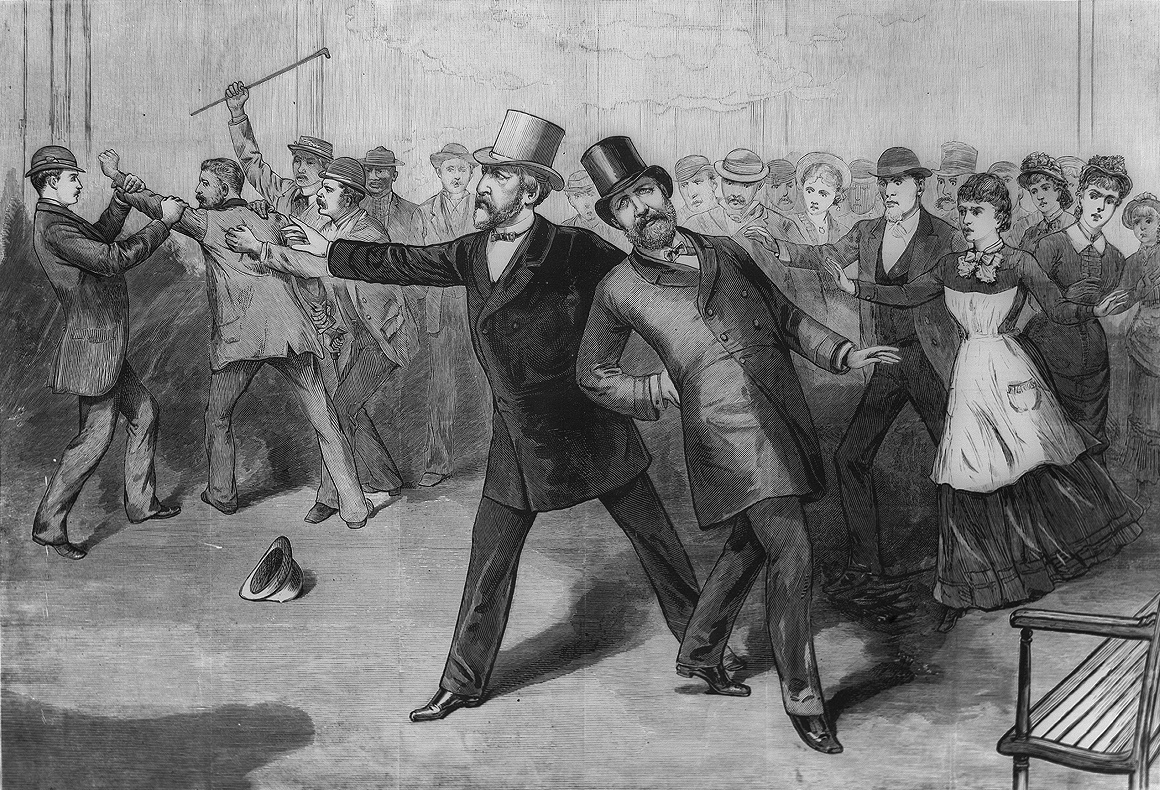
President James A. Garfield with Secretary of State James G. Blaine after being shot by Guiteau, as depicted in a period engraving from Frank Leslie’s Illustrated Newspaper.

Guiteau conceded that the president would be too strong to kill with a knife, stating, "Garfield would have crushed the life out of me with a single blow of his fist!" He settled on a gun after contemplating what weapon he would use for the assassination. Guiteau felt that God told him to kill the president; he felt that such an act would be a "removal" as opposed to an assassination. He also felt that Garfield needed to be killed to rid the Republican Party of Blaine's influence. Borrowing $15 from George Maynard, a relative by marriage, Guiteau set out to purchase a revolver. He knew little about firearms, but Guiteau believed that he would need a large-caliber gun. While shopping at O'Meara's store in Washington, he had to choose between a .442 Webley caliber British Bulldog revolver with wood grips or one with ivory grips. Guiteau preferred the one with the ivory handle, because he thought it would look better as a museum exhibit after the assassination. Though Guiteau could not afford the extra dollar for the ivory grips, the store owner dropped the price for him. Guiteau spent the next few weeks in target practice; the recoil from the revolver almost knocked him over the first time he fired it.

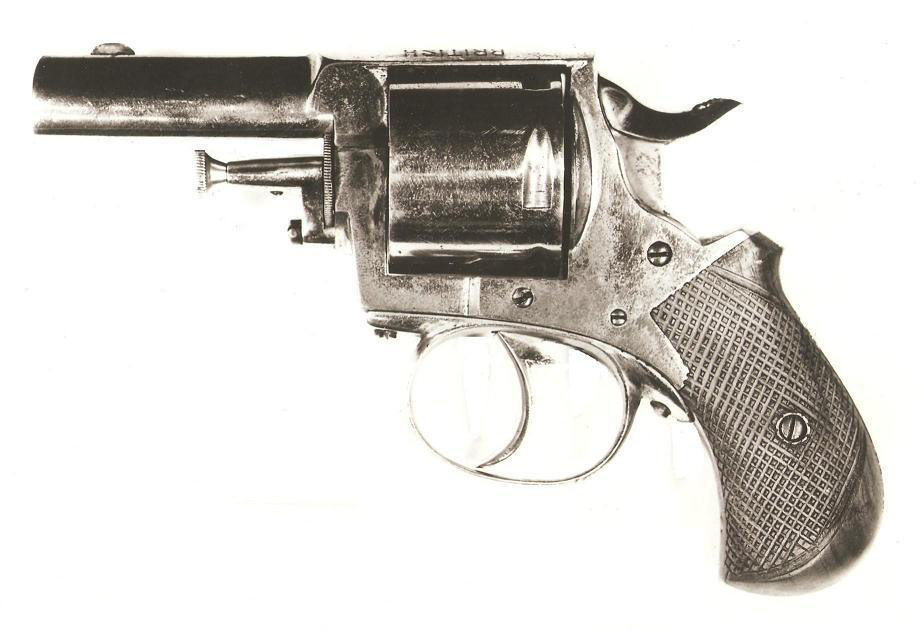
The Webley & Scott 0.44 in. British Bulldog revolver Guiteau used to shoot Garfield.

On one occasion, Guiteau trailed Garfield to the since-demolished Baltimore and Potomac Railroad Station as the president was seeing his wife, Lucretia, off to a beach resort in Long Branch, New Jersey. However, Guiteau decided to postpone his plan because she was in poor health, and he did not want to upset her.

On July 1st 1881, Guiteau sent a pre-emptive note to William T. Sherman, the Commanding General of the Army, announcing the assassination. In the note, Guiteau described himself as "a lawyer, theologian, and politician" and "a stalwart of the Stalwarts." He claimed that the removal of Garfield was "a political necessity," and asked Sherman to send troops to take possession of whichever jail was holding him. Sherman responded that he had never met or heard of Guiteau.

The following day, July 2, 1881, having been alerted to Garfield's schedule by a newspaper article, Guiteau lay in wait at the railroad station, getting his shoes shined, pacing, and engaging a cab to take him to the police station to turn himself in after the shooting.

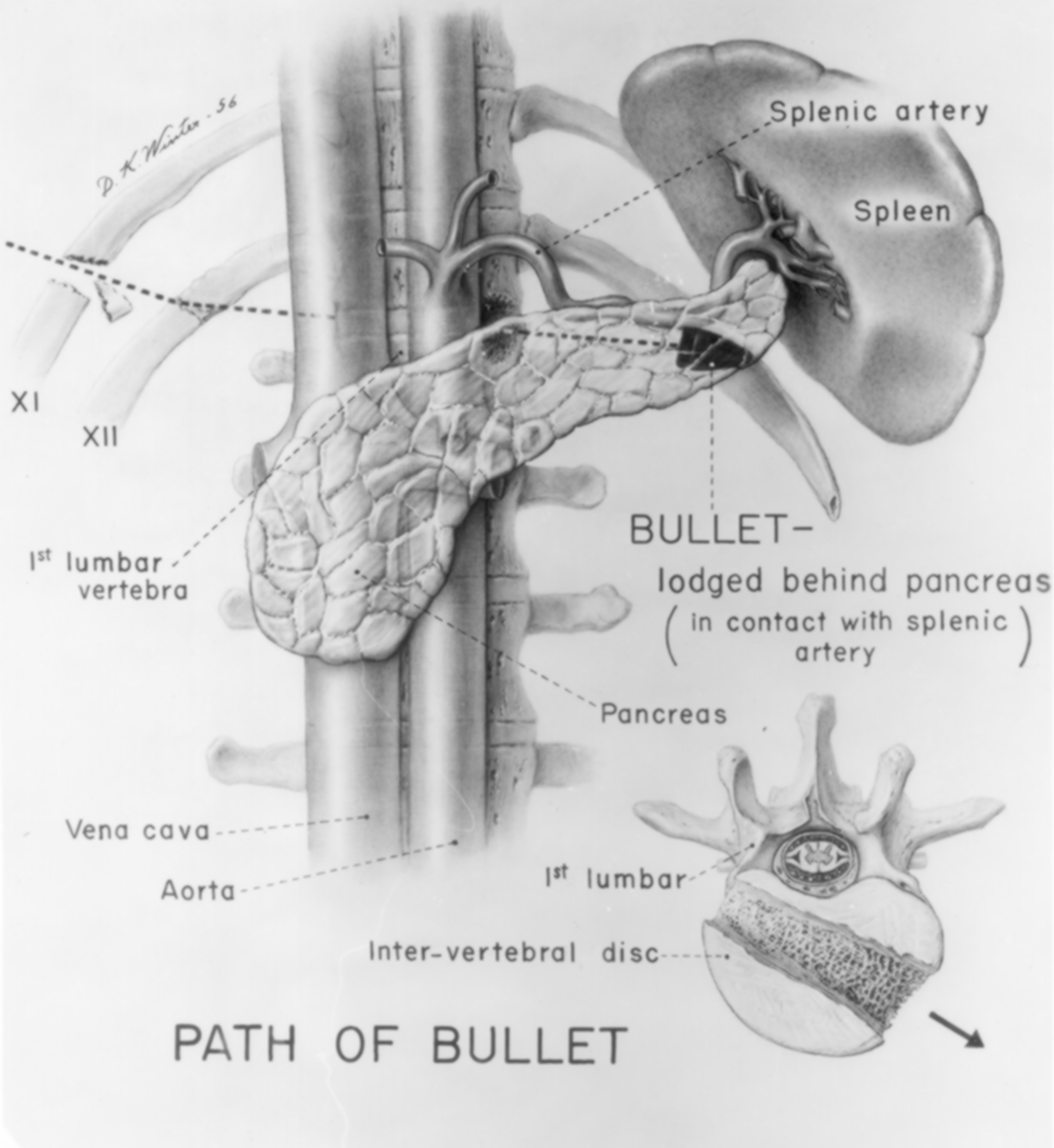
Path of the bullet that wounded President Garfield.

As Garfield entered the station, looking forward to a vacation with his wife in Long Branch, Guiteau stepped forward and shot Garfield twice from behind; one shot grazed Garfield's shoulder, and the other pierced the first lumbar vertebra, but missed the spinal cord. As he attempted to escape, Guiteau collided with policeman Patrick Kearney, who was entering the station after hearing the shots. Kearney apprehended Guiteau, and was so excited at having arrested the man who had shot the president that he neglected to confiscate Guiteau’s gun until after they arrived at the police station.

The rapidly gathering crowd screamed to "lynch him," but Kearney and several other police officers took him to the police station a few blocks away. Guiteau repeatedly said: "I am a Stalwart of the Stalwarts. ... Arthur is president now!" Guiteau's weapon was given to the Smithsonian, but it has since been lost.

=== Death of Garfield ===
After a long, painful battle with infections, possibly brought on by his doctors' poking and probing of the wound with unwashed hands and unsterilized instruments, Garfield died on September 19, 1881—eleven weeks after being shot. Modern physicians familiar with the case state that Garfield would have easily recovered from his wounds with sterile medical care, but that was not common in the United States until a decade later, and Candice Millard argues that Garfield would have survived Guiteau's bullet wound had his doctors simply left him alone. Dr. Ira M. Rutkow, a medical historian and professor of surgery at the University of Medicine and Dentistry of New Jersey, has argued that starvation also played a role, suggesting, "In today's world, he would have gone home in a matter of two or three days."

The conventional narrative regarding Garfield's post-shooting medical condition was also challenged by Duke University surgeon Dr. Theodore Pappas and pediatric surgeon Dr. Shahrzad Joharifard in a 2013 article in The American Journal of Surgery. They argued that Garfield died from a late rupture of a splenic artery pseudoaneurysm, which developed secondary to the path of the bullet adjacent to the splenic artery. They also argued that his sepsis was actually caused by post-traumatic acute acalculous cholecystitis. Based on the autopsy report, the authors speculate that his gallbladder subsequently ruptured, leading to the development of a large bile-containing abscess adjacent to the gallbladder. Pappas and Joharifard suggest this caused the septic decline in Garfield's condition that was visible starting from July 23, 1881.

== Trial and execution ==
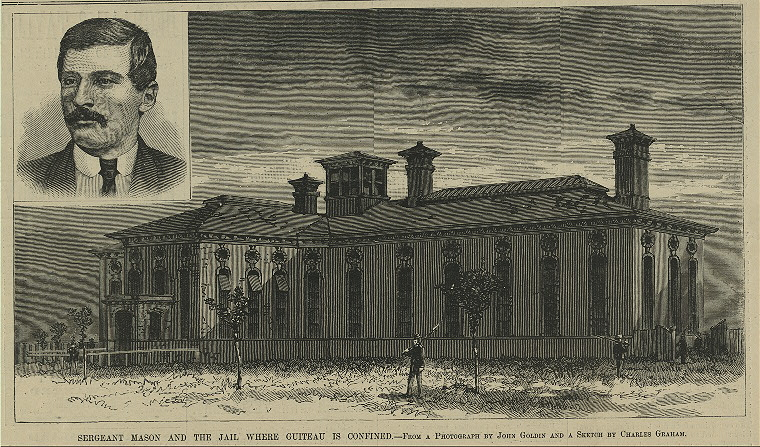
An illustration of the jail where Guiteau was confined after his arrest.

Once Garfield died, the government officially charged Guiteau with murder. He was formally indicted on October 14, 1881, on the charge of murder, upgraded from the previous charge of attempted murder. Guiteau pleaded not guilty to the charge. He also sent Arthur a letter, in which he argued that Arthur should set him free because by killing Garfield, he had elevated Arthur to the presidency and increased Arthur's salary from $8,000 to $50,000. The trial began in Washington, D.C., on November 17, in the Supreme Court for the District of Columbia (which became the U.S. District Court for the District of Columbia). The presiding judge in the case was Walter Smith Cox. Although Guiteau insisted on trying to represent himself during the entire trial, the court appointed Leigh Robinson to defend him. After less than a week of trial, Robinson retired from the case. George Scoville then became lead defense counsel. While Scoville's legal experience lay in land title examination, he had married Guiteau's sister and felt obliged to defend him. Wayne MacVeagh, the U.S. Attorney General, served as the chief prosecutor. MacVeagh named five lawyers to the prosecution team: George Corkhill, Walter Davidge, retired judge John K. Porter, Elihu Root, and E. B. Smith.

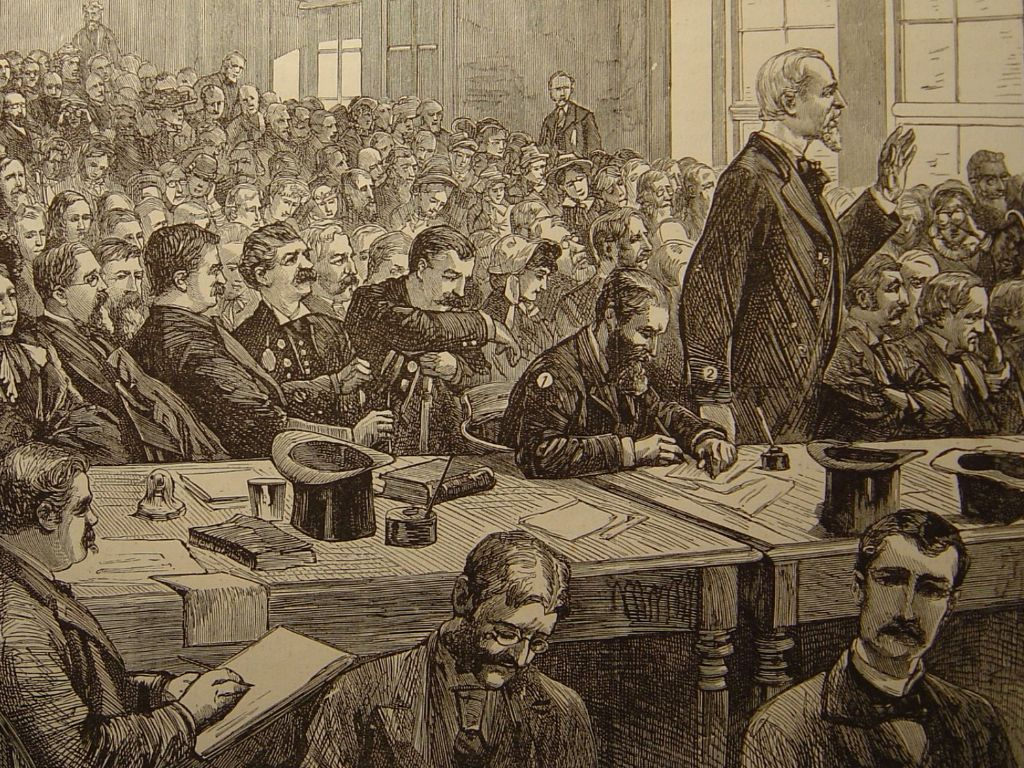
The trial of Guiteau, as depicted in the French newspaper L'Illustration, 1881

Guiteau's trial was one of the first high-profile cases in the United States where a defense based on a claim of temporary insanity was considered. Guiteau vehemently insisted that while he had been legally insane at the time of the shooting (claiming God had taken away his free will), he was not medically insane, which was one of the major causes of the rift between Guiteau and his defense lawyers. The judge gave the jury instructions based on the M'Naghten test.

The defense hired Edward Charles Spitzka, a leading alienist, (Note: What we would now call a psychiatrist. See Wiktionary.) as an expert witness in support of an insanity defense. Spitzka had stated that it was clear "Guiteau is not only now insane, but that he was never anything else." While on the stand, Spitzka testified that he had "no doubt" that Guiteau was both insane and "a moral monstrosity." He came to the conclusion that Guiteau had "the insane manner" he had so often observed in asylums, adding that Guiteau was a "morbid egotist" with "a tendency to misinterpret the real affairs of life." He thought the condition to be the result of "a congenital malformation of the brain."

Corkhill, who was the District of Columbia's district attorney and on the prosecuting team, summed up the prosecution's opinion of Guiteau's insanity defense in a pre-trial press statement that also mirrored public opinion on the issue:

He's no more insane than I am. There's nothing of the mad about Guiteau: he's a cool, calculating blackguard, a polished ruffian, who has gradually prepared himself to pose in this way before the world. He was a deadbeat, pure and simple. Finally, he got tired of the monotony of deadbeating. He wanted excitement of some other kind and notoriety ... and he got it.

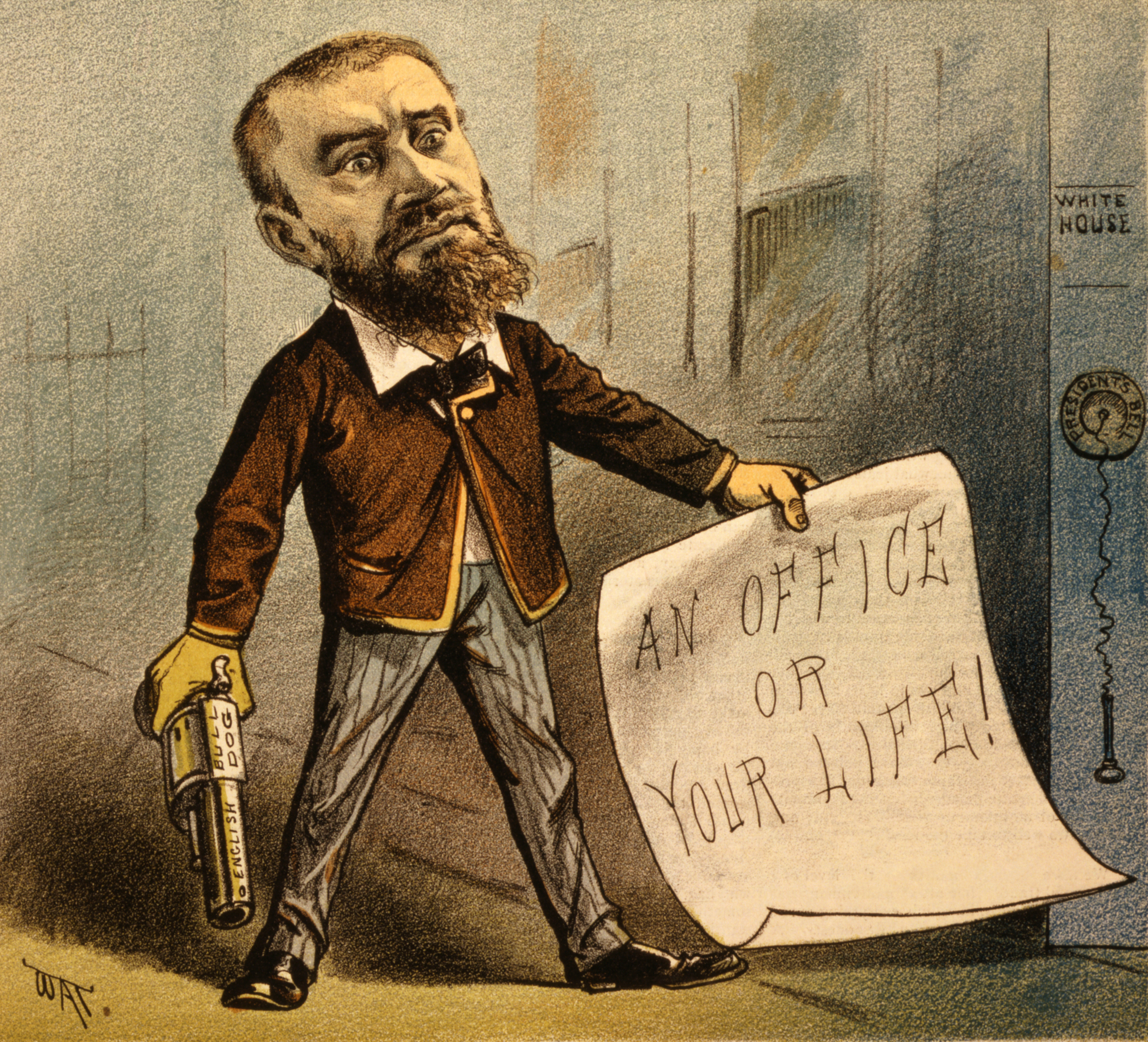
1881 political cartoon from the magazine Puck, showing Guiteau holding a gun and a note that says "An office or your life!" The caption for the cartoon reads "Model Office Seeker".

Guiteau became something of a media sensation during his entire trial for his bizarre behavior, which included his cursing and insulting the judge, most of the witnesses, the prosecution, and even his defense team, as well as formatting his testimony in epic poems which he recited at length, and soliciting legal advice from random spectators in the audience via passed notes. He dictated an autobiography to the New York Herald, ending it with a personal ad for "a nice Christian lady under 30 years of age." He appeared oblivious to the American public's hatred of him, even after he was almost killed twice himself. He frequently smiled and waved at spectators and reporters in and out of the courtroom.

At one point, Guiteau argued before Cox that Garfield was killed not by the bullets, but by medical malpractice; "The doctors killed Garfield, I just shot him." Throughout the trial and up until his execution, Guiteau was housed at St. Elizabeths Hospital in the southeastern quadrant of Washington, D.C. While in prison and awaiting execution, Guiteau wrote a defense of the assassination he had committed and an account of his own trial, which was published as The Truth, and the Removal.

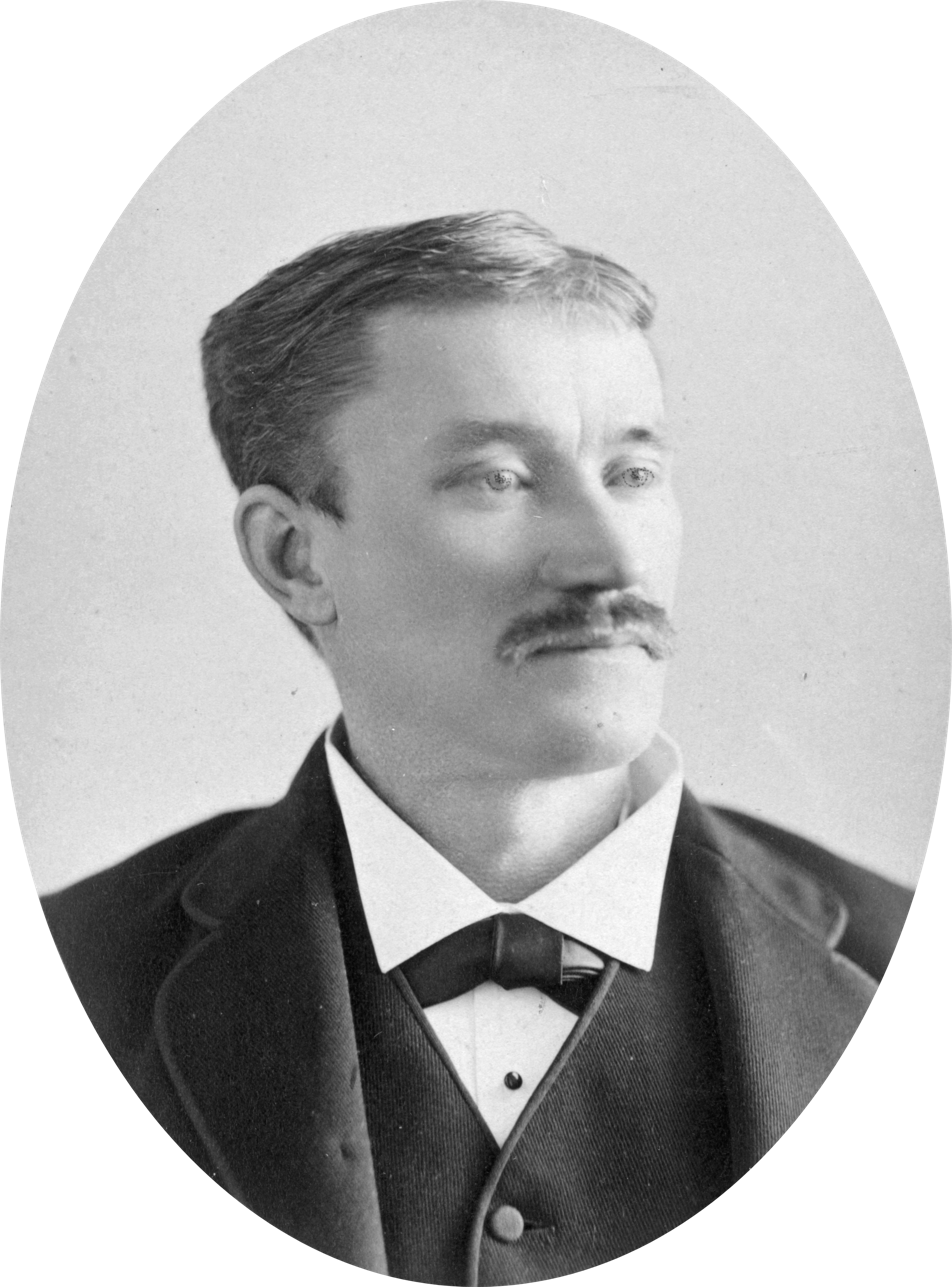
Portrait by C. M. Bell, taken at the D.C. Jail on February 6, 1882

To the end, Guiteau was making plans to start a lecture tour after his perceived imminent release and to run for president himself in 1884, while at the same time continuing to delight in the media circus surrounding his trial. He was found guilty on January 25, 1882, and sentenced to death. After the guilty verdict was read, Guiteau stepped forward, despite his lawyers' efforts to tell him to be quiet, and yelled at the jury, saying, "You are all low, consummate jackasses!" He shouted a further stream of curses and obscenities before he was taken away by guards to his cell to await execution. Guiteau appealed, but his conviction was upheld.

In the weeks before his execution, Guiteau composed a lengthy poem asserting that God had commanded him to kill Garfield to prevent Blaine's "scheming" to go to war with Chile and Peru during the War of the Pacific. The Evening Star printed this poem on June 7, but omitted two verses denigrating Arthur and the Supreme Court. Guiteau also claimed that Arthur knew the assassination had saved the United States, and that Arthur's refusal to pardon him was the "basest ingratitude."

The night before his June 30 execution, Guiteau was restless, tossing and turning in his cell. That morning, he seemed calm. On the way to the gallows, Guiteau was accompanied by warden John S. Crocker, hangman Robert Strong, the Rev. W. W. Hicks, and four guards. His hands were tied. He tripped on the first step of the scaffold and stubbed his toe. On the scaffold, Hicks delivered a short prayer; then, Guiteau read aloud from Matthew 10:28–41 (Guiteau's hands being tied, Hicks held the Bible open for him); subsequently delivered a "last dying prayer," in which he declared that God "did inspire the act for which I am now murdered," and predicted that "this government and this nation, by this act, will incur Thy eternal enmity." He added that "Thy divine law of retribution will strike this nation and my murderers." Guiteau also excoriated President Arthur as "a coward and an ingrate whose ingratitude to the man that made him and saved his party and land from overthrow has no parallel in history." Finally, Guiteau "chant[ed], in a sad, doleful style," a poem "that I wrote this morning about 10 o'clock" called "I Am Going to the Lordy," which he had written during his incarceration. Multiple times during the reading, Guiteau's voice faltered and he began sobbing, even stopping to lay his head on Hicks' shoulder. After he finished reading his poem, a black hood was placed over Guiteau's head. He shouted out "Glory!" three times, and may have also said, "I come! Ready! Go!" By prearrangement with Strong, Guiteau signaled that he was ready to die by dropping the paper, and the gallows trapdoor was sprung at 12:40 PM. After only one sign of muscle contraction, Guiteau was cut down. Although the rope had broken his neck instantly with the fall, doctors found that Guiteau's heart and pulse were still detectable, but within approximately fifteen minutes, his heart and pulse slowed down and stopped.

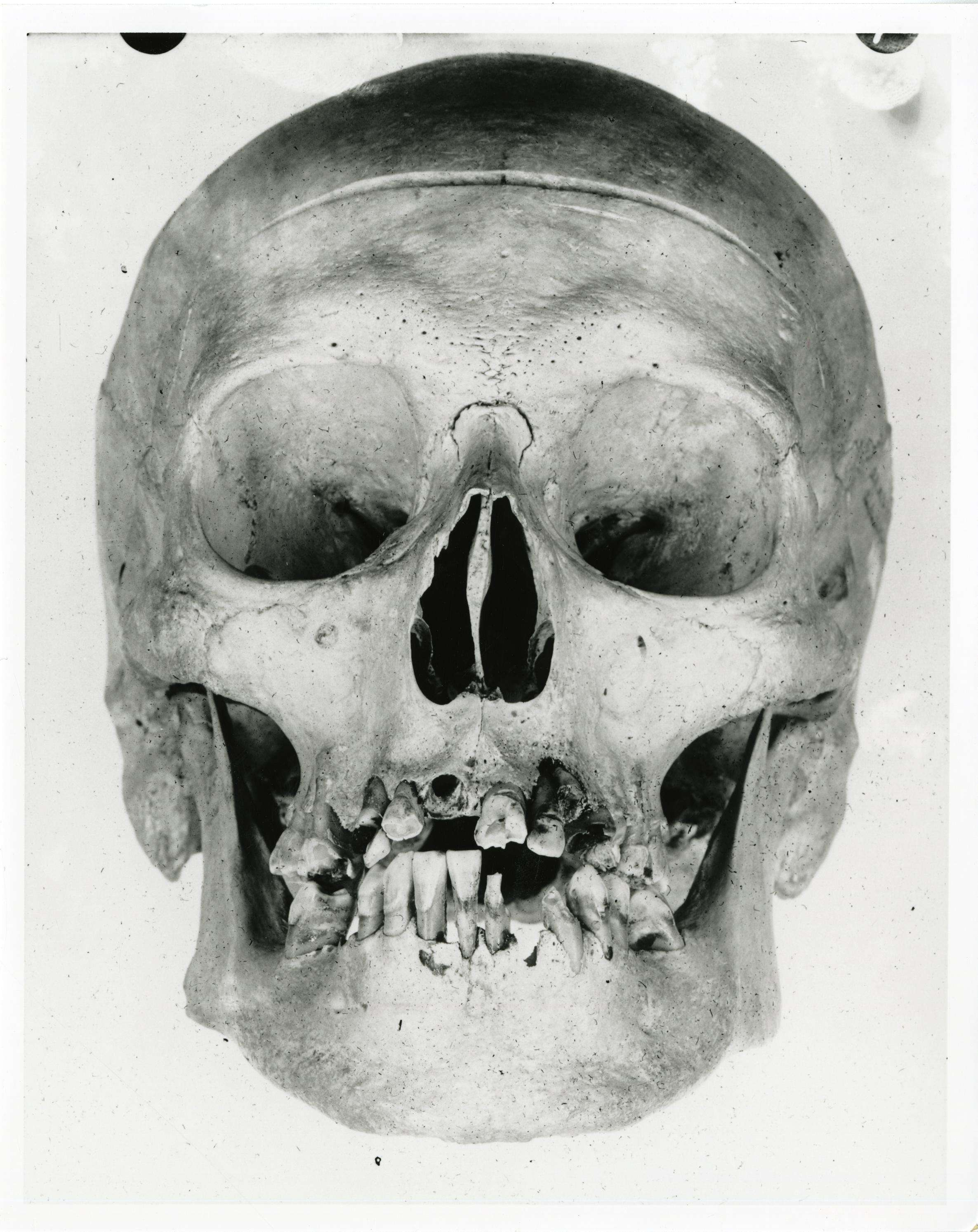
Skull of Guiteau in the National Museum of Health and Medicine collection. He had advanced tooth decay at age 40.

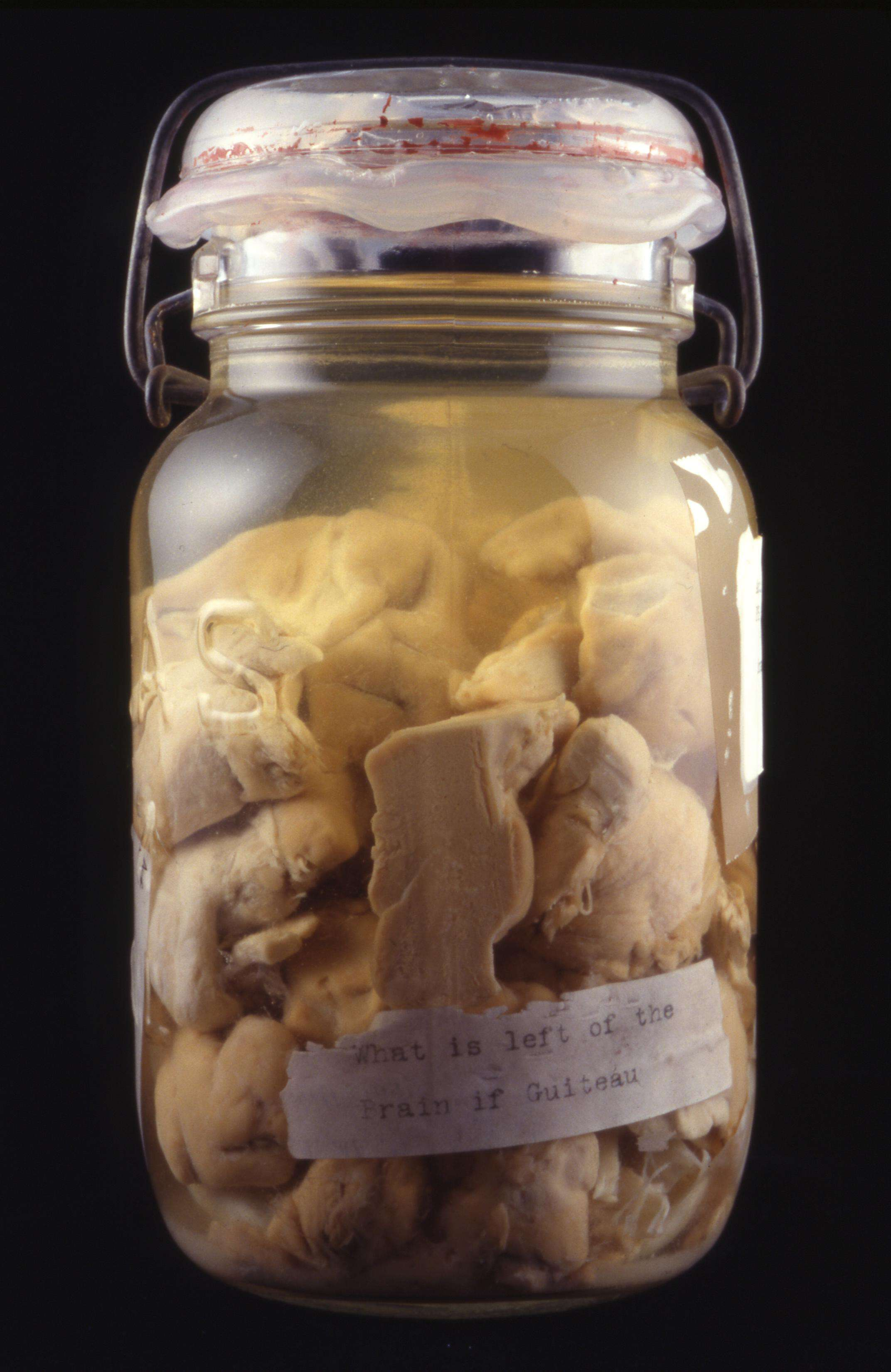
Portions of Guiteau's brain in the National Museum of Health and Medicine collection.

Guiteau's body was not returned to his family, as they were unable to afford a private funeral, but was instead autopsied and buried in a corner of the jail yard. With tiny pieces of the hanging rope already being sold as souvenirs to a fascinated public, rumors immediately began to swirl that jail guards planned to dig up Guiteau's corpse to meet demands of this burgeoning new market. Fearing scandal, the decision was made to disinter the corpse. The body was sent to the National Museum of Health and Medicine in Maryland, which preserved Guiteau's brain, as well as his spleen (which the autopsy discovered to have been enlarged), and bleached his skeleton. These were placed in storage by the museum. Parts of Guiteau's brain remain on display in a jar at the Mütter Museum in Philadelphia.

== Psychological assessment ==
In 1881, psychiatrist Allan McLane Hamilton testified that he believed that Guiteau was sane when he assassinated Garfield. Upon his autopsy, it was discovered that Guiteau had the condition known as phimosis, an inability to retract the foreskin, which at the time was thought to have caused the insanity that led him to assassinate Garfield. An autopsy of his brain revealed that his dura mater was abnormally thick, suggesting he had neurosyphilis, a disease which causes mental instability. George Paulson, formerly the chair of neurology at Ohio State University, disputed the neurosyphilis diagnosis, arguing that Guiteau had both schizophrenia and "grandiose narcissism."

== In media ==
The life of Guiteau, focusing on his psychological disturbances and his plan to kill Garfield, is the subject of 1980's "Portrait of an Assassin," a radio play by James Agate Jr. Produced as Episode 1125 of CBS Radio Mystery Theater, Guiteau was voiced by John Lithgow.

In Assassins, a musical by Stephen Sondheim and John Weidman, Guiteau is depicted as a mentor of Sara Jane Moore, who attempted to assassinate Gerald Ford.

In the American Dad! episode "Garfield and Friends," Hayley Smith uses Guiteau's DNA to revive him, then uses him like a bloodhound to track down a revived Garfield.

The Ramblin' Jack Elliott song "The Death of Mister Garfield" recounts the assassination and the reactions of a fictional witness. Johnny Cash learned the song from Elliott, and later recorded a re-worked version as "Mr. Garfield."

In the alternate history short story "I Shall Have a Flight to Glory" by Michael P. Kube-McDowell, from 1992's anthology Alternate Presidents edited by Mike Resnick, Guiteau and Garfield are allies against Samuel J. Tilden, who has become a tyrannical president.

On screen, Guiteau has been portrayed by:

- Ron Vawter (1990) Insanity On Trial; PBS documentary episode, American Experience
- Will Janowitz (2016) Murder of a President; PBS documentary episode, American Experience
- Matthew Macfadyen (2025) Death by Lightning; Netflix miniseries

== See also ==
- List of assassins
- John Wilkes Booth, assassin of President Abraham Lincoln
- Leon Czolgosz, assassin of President William McKinley
- Lee Harvey Oswald, assassin of President John F. Kennedy
- Patrick Eugene Prendergast, assassin of Chicago Mayor Carter Harrison III (similar motive to Guiteau, drew immediate comparison)
- Sirhan Sirhan, assassin of Politician Robert F. Kennedy
- John Schrank, attempted assassin of President Theodore Roosevelt (very similar psychological profile)
