= Charles Gilbert Jr. =

Charles Gilbert Jr. is a writer, composer, director and educator who specializes in musical theater. Gilbert served as Director of the Brind School from 2008 to 2013 after heading its Musical Theater Program for nearly twenty years.
