= Dave Fredrickson =

American anthropologist

David Allen Fredrickson (August 11, 1927 – August 28, 2012) was an American archaeologist, anthropologist, and folk singer.

He was born in Berkeley, California, and moved with his family to Redwood City in 1932, spending much of his childhood with his mother's farming family in the San Joaquin Valley. He enrolled at the University of California, Berkeley, in 1944, and returned there after a period in the U.S. Navy at the end of World War II. He started graduate studies in archaeology at Berkeley, but left in 1952 and took various jobs including driving cabs and trucks, gardening work, and giving guitar lessons. He married in 1954.

A lover of old-time and cowboy songs, and influenced by Woody Guthrie and Burl Ives, he stated that "I do not consider myself to be a folk-singer; more I am a singer of old-time songs." He recorded an album, Songs of the West, for Folkways Records in 1961. The album was described by the Journal of American Folklore as "a masterpiece of straightforward western style singing."

He returned to archaeology in 1960 and began working on excavations across California. He completed his M.A. degree at University of California, Davis in 1966, and gained a Ph.D. in 1973. In 1967 he was appointed to the Anthropology Department at Sonoma State College, where he rose to become Professor in 1976. He developed the work of the archaeology program particularly through cooperation, mutual respect, and beneficial relationships between the indigenous peoples of California and archaeologists. He retired in 1992, and the Anthropological Collections Facility at Sonoma State University was named in his honor in 2004.

Throughout his career he continued his active involvement in music groups in and around Berkeley, organising the Crabgrass group and releasing a CD, Four Cords, in 2005. He died in 2012 at the age of 85.
