= Statues of the National Statuary Hall Collection =

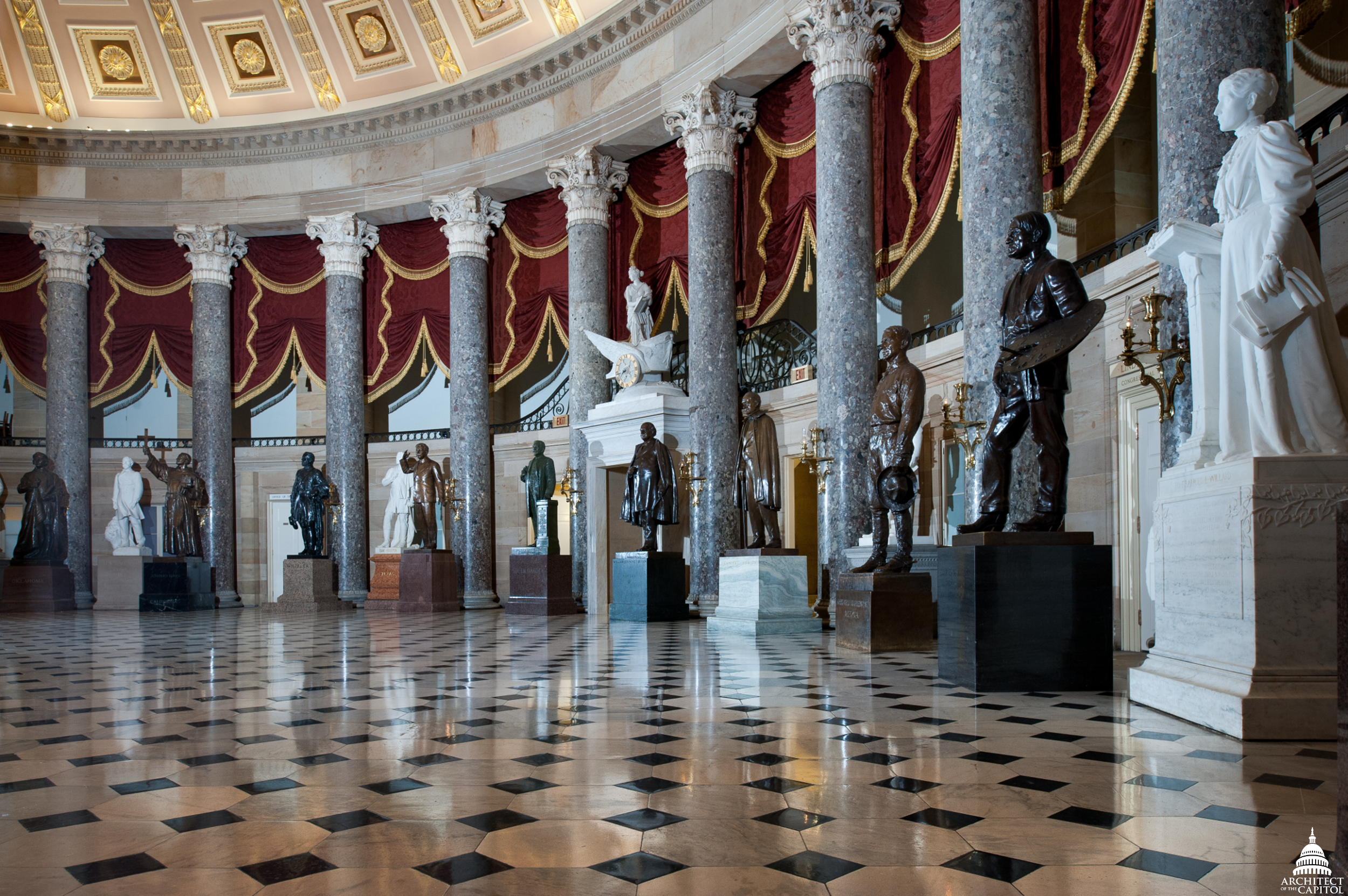
Part of the National Statuary Hall Collection in the National Statuary Hall, 2016

The National Statuary Hall Collection holds statues donated by each of the United States, portraying notable persons in the histories of the respective states. Displayed in the National Statuary Hall and other parts of the United States Capitol in Washington, D.C., the collection includes two statues from each state.

On July 2, 1864, Congress established the National Statuary Hall: "States [may] provide and furnish statues, in marble or bronze, not exceeding two in number for each State, of deceased persons who have been citizens thereof, and illustrious for their historic renown or for distinguished civic or military services such as each State may deem to be worthy of this national commemoration." The first statue was installed in 1870, and, by 1971, the collection included at least one statue from every state. In 1933, Congress passed House Concurrent Resolution No. 47, which limited each state to only one statue in the Statuary Hall. Others would be distributed throughout the Capitol building. In 2000, Congress amended a law to allow states to replace their statues. 17 statues have since then been removed and replaced.

The National Statuary Hall Collection comprises 61 statues of bronze and 39 of marble. Several sculptors have created multiple statues for the collection, the most prolific being Charles Henry Niehaus who sculpted eight statues currently and formerly in the collection. The US states that sent the statues, not Congress nor the Architect of the Capitol, are authorized to remove them. Kansas was the first state to replace a statue in 2003, and the first state to replace both in 2022.

== Statues ==
=== Current ===
Table featuring sculptures in the National Statuary Hall Collection
Commissioned by	Statue (Note: For each entry, the word "Statue" links to the article on the statue itself and the person's name links to the article on the person)	Image	Medium	Sculptor	Year placed	Location	Ref.
Alabama	Statue of Helen Keller		Bronze	Edward Hlavka	2009	Capitol Visitor Center	
Alabama	Statue of Joseph Wheeler		Bronze	Berthold Nebel	1925	National Statuary Hall	
Alaska	Statue of Edward Lewis "Bob" Bartlett		Bronze	Felix de Weldon	1971	House corridor, 2nd floor	
Alaska	Statue of Ernest Gruening		Bronze	George Anthonisen	1977	Capitol Visitor Center	
Arizona	Statue of Barry Goldwater		Bronze	Deborah Copenhaver Fellows	2015	National Statuary Hall	
Arizona	Statue of Eusebio Kino		Bronze	Suzanne Silvercruys	1965	Capitol Visitor Center	
Arkansas	Statue of Johnny Cash		Bronze	Kevin Kresse	2024	Capitol Visitor Center	
Arkansas	Statue of Daisy Bates		Bronze	Benjamin Victor	2024	National Statuary Hall	
California	Statue of Ronald Reagan		Bronze	Chas Fagan	2009	Rotunda	
California	Statue of Junípero Serra		Bronze	Ettore Cadorin	1931	National Statuary Hall	
Colorado	Statue of Florence R. Sabin		Bronze	Joy Buba	1959	Hall of Columns	
Colorado	Statue of Jack Swigert		Bronze	Mark Lundeen and George Lundeen	1997	Capitol Visitor Center	
Connecticut	Statue of Roger Sherman		Marble	Chauncey Ives	1872	Crypt	
Connecticut	Statue of Jonathan Trumbull		Marble	Chauncey Ives	1872	House corridor, 2nd floor	
Delaware	Statue of John M. Clayton		Marble	Bryant Baker	1934	Capitol Visitor Center	
Delaware	Statue of Caesar Rodney		Marble	Bryant Baker	1934	Crypt	
Florida	Statue of John Gorrie		Marble	C. Adrian Pillars	1914	National Statuary Hall	
Florida	Statue of Mary McLeod Bethune		Marble	Nilda M. Comas	2022	National Statuary Hall	
Georgia	Statue of Crawford Long		Marble	J. Massey Rhind	1926	Crypt	
Georgia	Statue of Alexander H. Stephens		Marble	Gutzon Borglum	1927	National Statuary Hall	
Hawaii	Statue of Father Damien		Bronze	Marisol Escobar	1969	Hall of Columns	
Hawaii	Statue of Kamehameha I		Bronze	Thomas Ridgeway Gould	1969	Capitol Visitor Center	
Idaho	Statue of William Borah		Bronze	Bryant Baker	1947	Capitol Visitor Center	
Idaho	Statue of George L. Shoup		Marble	Frederick Triebel	1910	National Statuary Hall	
Illinois	Statue of James Shields		Bronze	Leonard W. Volk	1893	Hall of Columns	
Illinois	Statue of Frances Willard		Marble	Helen Farnsworth Mears	1905	National Statuary Hall	
Indiana	Statue of Oliver P. Morton		Marble	Charles Niehaus	1900	Senate Wing, 1st floor	
Indiana	Statue of Lew Wallace		Marble	Andrew O'Connor	1910	National Statuary Hall	
Iowa	Statue of Norman Borlaug		Bronze	Benjamin Victor	2014	National Statuary Hall	
Iowa	Statue of Samuel J. Kirkwood		Bronze	Vinnie Ream	1913	National Statuary Hall	
Kansas	Statue of Dwight D. Eisenhower		Bronze	Jim Brothers	2003	Rotunda	
Kansas	Statue of Amelia Earhart		Bronze	Mark Lundeen and George Lundeen	2022	National Statuary Hall	
Kentucky	Statue of Henry Clay		Bronze	Charles Niehaus	1929	National Statuary Hall	
Kentucky	Statue of Ephraim McDowell		Bronze	Charles Niehaus	1929	Capitol Visitor Center	
Louisiana	Statue of Huey Long		Bronze	Charles Keck	1941	National Statuary Hall	
Louisiana	Statue of Edward Douglass White		Bronze	Arthur C. Morgan	1955	Capitol Visitor Center	
Maine	Statue of Hannibal Hamlin		Bronze	Charles Tefft	1935	National Statuary Hall	
Maine	Statue of William King		Marble	Franklin Simmons	1878	House corridor, 2nd floor	
Maryland	Statue of Charles Carroll of Carrollton		Bronze	Richard E. Brooks	1903	Crypt	
Maryland	Statue of John Hanson		Bronze	Richard E. Brooks	1903	Senate corridor, 2nd floor	
Massachusetts	Statue of Samuel Adams		Marble	Anne Whitney	1876	Crypt	
Massachusetts	Statue of John Winthrop		Marble	Richard S. Greenough	1876	Hall of Columns	
Michigan	Statue of Lewis Cass		Marble	Daniel Chester French	1889	National Statuary Hall	
Michigan	Statue of Gerald Ford		Bronze	J. Brett Grill	2011	Rotunda	
Minnesota	Statue of Henry Mower Rice		Marble	Frederick Triebel	1916	National Statuary Hall	
Minnesota	Statue of Maria Sanford		Bronze	Evelyn Raymond	1958	Capitol Visitor Center	
Mississippi	Statue of Jefferson Davis		Bronze	Augustus Lukeman	1931	National Statuary Hall	
Mississippi	Statue of James Z. George		Bronze	Augustus Lukeman	1931	Capitol Visitor Center	
Missouri	Statue of Harry S. Truman		Bronze	Tom Corbin	2022	Rotunda	
Missouri	Statue of Francis Preston Blair Jr.		Marble	Alexander Doyle	1899	Hall of Columns	
Montana	Statue of Jeannette Rankin		Bronze	Terry Mimnaugh	1985	Capitol Visitor Center	
Montana	Statue of Charles Marion Russell		Bronze	John Weaver	1959	National Statuary Hall	
Nebraska	Statue of Standing Bear		Bronze	Benjamin Victor	2019	National Statuary Hall	
Nebraska	Statue of Willa Cather		Bronze	Littleton Alston	2023	Capitol Visitor Center	
Nevada	Statue of Pat McCarran		Bronze	Yolande Jacobson	1960	Senate Wing, 2nd floor	
Nevada	Statue of Sarah Winnemucca		Bronze	Benjamin Victor	2005	Capitol Visitor Center	
New Hampshire	Statue of John Stark		Marble	Carl Conrads	1894	Crypt	
New Hampshire	Statue of Daniel Webster		Marble	Carl Conrads (after Thomas Ball)	1894	National Statuary Hall	
New Jersey	Statue of Philip Kearny		Bronze	Henry Kirke Brown	1888	Hall of Columns	
New Jersey	Statue of Richard Stockton		Marble	Henry Kirke Brown (completed by Henry Kirke Bush-Brown)	1888	Crypt	
New Mexico	Statue of Dennis Chávez		Bronze	Felix de Weldon	1966	Senate Wing, 2nd floor	
New Mexico	Statue of Po'pay		Marble	Cliff Fragua	2005	Capitol Visitor Center	
New York	Statue of George Clinton		Bronze	Henry Kirke Brown	1873	Senate Wing, 2nd floor	
New York	Statue of Robert R. Livingston		Bronze	Erastus Dow Palmer	1875	Crypt	
North Carolina	Statue of Billy Graham		Bronze	Chas Fagan	2024	Crypt	
North Carolina	Statue of Zebulon Baird Vance		Bronze	Gutzon Borglum	1916	National Statuary Hall	
North Dakota	Statue of John Burke		Bronze	Avard Fairbanks	1963	National Statuary Hall	
North Dakota	Statue of Sakakawea		Bronze	Arizona Bronze Atelier (after Leonard Crunelle, 1909)	2003	Capitol Visitor Center	
Ohio	Statue of Thomas Edison		Bronze	Alan Cottrill	2016	National Statuary Hall	
Ohio	Statue of James A. Garfield		Marble	Charles Niehaus	1886	Rotunda	
Oklahoma	Statue of Will Rogers		Bronze	Jo Davidson	1939	House corridor, 2nd floor	
Oklahoma	Statue of Sequoyah		Bronze	Vinnie Ream (completed by G. Julian Zolnay)	1917	National Statuary Hall	
Oregon	Statue of Jason Lee		Bronze	Gifford MacGregor Proctor	1953	National Statuary Hall	
Oregon	Statue of John McLoughlin		Bronze	Gifford MacGregor Proctor	1953	Capitol Visitor Center	
Pennsylvania	Statue of Robert Fulton		Marble	Howard Roberts	1889	National Statuary Hall	
Pennsylvania	Statue of Peter Muhlenberg		Marble	Blanche Nevin	1889	Crypt	
Rhode Island	Statue of Nathanael Greene		Marble	Henry Kirke Brown	1870	Crypt	
Rhode Island	Statue of Roger Williams		Marble	Franklin Simmons	1872	Senate corridor, 2nd floor	
South Carolina	Statue of John C. Calhoun		Marble	Frederick Ruckstull	1910	Crypt	
South Carolina	Statue of Wade Hampton III		Marble	Frederick Ruckstull	1929	Capitol Visitor Center	
South Dakota	Statue of William Henry Harrison Beadle		Bronze	H. Daniel Webster	1938	National Statuary Hall	
South Dakota	Statue of Joseph Ward		Marble	Bruno Beghé	1963	Capitol Visitor Center	
Tennessee	Statue of Andrew Jackson		Bronze	Belle Kinney Scholz and Leopold Scholz	1928	Rotunda	
Tennessee	Statue of John Sevier		Bronze	Belle Kinney Scholz and Leopold Scholz	1931	National Statuary Hall	
Texas	Statue of Stephen F. Austin		Marble	Elisabet Ney	1905	Hall of Columns	
Texas	Statue of Sam Houston		Marble	Elisabet Ney	1905	National Statuary Hall	
Utah	Statue of Martha Hughes Cannon		Bronze	Ben Hammond	2024	Capitol Visitor Center	
Utah	Statue of Brigham Young		Marble	Mahonri Young	1950	National Statuary Hall	
Vermont	Statue of Ethan Allen		Marble	Larkin G. Mead	1876	National Statuary Hall	
Vermont	Statue of Jacob Collamer		Marble	Preston Powers	1881	Senate Wing, 1st floor	
Virginia	Statue of George Washington		Bronze	Jean-Antoine Houdon	1934	Rotunda	
Virginia	Statue of Barbara Rose Johns		Bronze	Steven Weitzman	2025	Crypt	
Washington	Statue of Mother Joseph Pariseau		Bronze	Felix de Weldon	1980	Capitol Visitor Center	
Washington	Statue of Marcus Whitman		Bronze	Avard Fairbanks	1953	National Statuary Hall	
West Virginia	Statue of John E. Kenna		Marble	Alexander Doyle	1901	Hall of Columns	
West Virginia	Statue of Francis Harrison Pierpont		Marble	Franklin Simmons	1910	National Statuary Hall	
Wisconsin	Statue of Robert M. La Follette		Marble	Jo Davidson	1929	National Statuary Hall	
Wisconsin	Statue of Jacques Marquette		Marble	Gaetano Trentanove	1896	House corridor, 2nd floor	
Wyoming	Statue of Esther Hobart Morris		Bronze	Avard Fairbanks	1960	Hall of Columns	
Wyoming	Statue of Washakie		Bronze	Dave McGary	2000	Capitol Visitor Center	

=== Former ===
Table featuring sculptures formerly in the National Statuary Hall Collection
State	Statue	Image	Medium	Sculptor	Year placed	Year replaced	Replaced by	Current Location	Ref.
Alabama	Statue of Jabez Lamar Monroe Curry		Marble	Dante Sodini	1908	2009	Statue of Helen Keller	Montgomery, Alabama	
Arizona	Statue of John Campbell Greenway		Bronze	Gutzon Borglum	1930	2015	Statue of Barry Goldwater	Phoenix, Arizona	
Arkansas	Statue of James Paul Clarke		Marble	Pompeo Coppini	1921	2024	Statue of Johnny Cash	unknown	
Arkansas	Statue of Uriah M. Rose		Marble	Frederick Ruckstull	1917	2024	Statue of Daisy Bates	Little Rock, Arkansas	
California	Statue of Thomas Starr King		Bronze	Haig Patigian	1931	2009	Statue of Ronald Reagan	Sacramento, California	
Florida	Statue of Edmund Kirby Smith		Bronze	C. Adrian Pillars	1922	2021	Statue of Mary McLeod Bethune	Tallahassee, Florida	
Iowa	Statue of James Harlan		Bronze	Nellie Walker	1910	2014	Statue of Norman Borlaug	Mount Pleasant, Iowa	
Kansas	Statue of George Washington Glick		Marble	Charles Henry Niehaus	1914	2003	Statue of Dwight D. Eisenhower	Atchison, Kansas	
Kansas	Statue of John James Ingalls		Marble	Charles Henry Neihaus	1905	2022	Statue of Amelia Earhart	Topeka, Kansas	
Michigan	Statue of Zachariah Chandler		Marble	Charles Henry Niehaus	1913	2011	Statue of Gerald Ford	Lansing, Michigan	
Missouri	Statue of Thomas Hart Benton		Marble	Alexander Doyle	1899	2022	Statue of Harry S. Truman	Columbia, Missouri	
Nebraska	Statue of William Jennings Bryan		Bronze	Rudulph Evans	1937	2019	Statue of Standing Bear	Seward, Nebraska	
Nebraska	Statue of Julius Sterling Morton		Bronze	Rudulph Evans	1937	2023	Statue of Willa Cather	Nebraska City, Nebraska	
North Carolina	Statue of Charles Brantley Aycock		Bronze	Charles Keck	1932	2024	Statue of Billy Graham	unknown	
Ohio	Statue of William Allen		Marble	Charles Henry Niehaus	1887	2016	Statue of Thomas Edison	Chillicothe, Ohio	
Virginia	Statue of Robert E. Lee		Bronze	Edward Virginius Valentine	1909	2020	Statue of Barbara Rose Johns	Richmond, Virginia	
Utah	Statue of Philo Farnsworth		Bronze	James Avati	1990	2024	Statue of Martha Hughes Cannon	Orem, Utah	

== See also ==
- United States Senate Vice Presidential Bust Collection
- Statue of Rosa Parks (U.S. Capitol)
