= Statue of John C. Calhoun =

Statue in the U.S. Capitol

John C. Calhoun
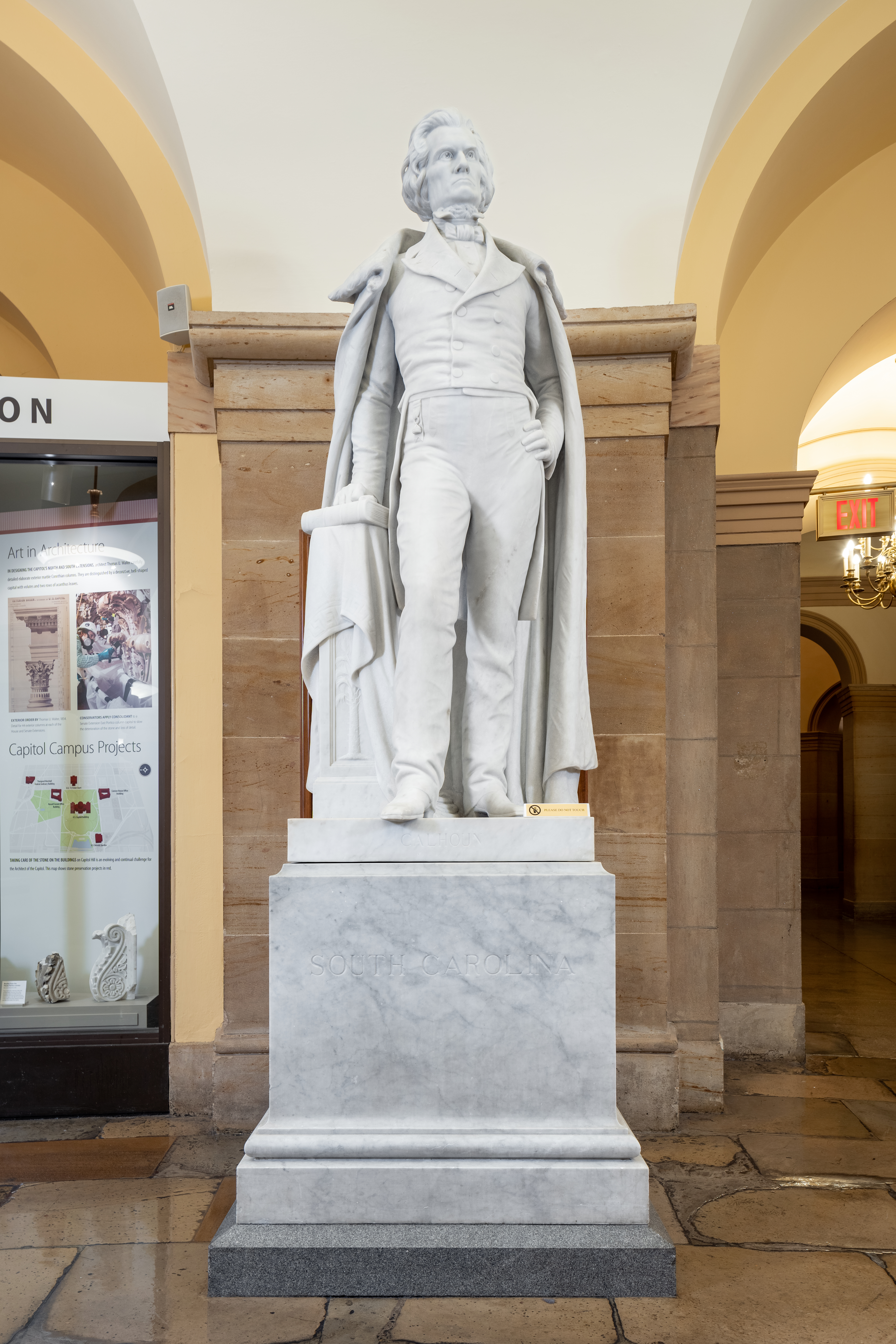
- The statue at the U.S. Capitol crypt in 2022
- Artist: Frederick Ruckstull
- Medium: Marble sculpture
- Subject: John C. Calhoun
- Location: Washington, D.C., United States

John C. Calhoun is a marble sculpture depicting the American statesman of the same name by Frederick Ruckstull, installed in the United States Capitol's crypt, in Washington, D.C., as part of the National Statuary Hall Collection. The statue was gifted by the U.S. state of South Carolina in 1910.

The statue is one of three that Ruckstull has had placed in the Collection.

== See also ==
- 1910 in art
