= Statue of Johnny Cash =

Statue installed in the US Capitol

- The statue in 2024
- Artist: Kevin Kresse
- Year: 2024
- Medium: Bronze sculpture
- Subject: Johnny Cash
- Location: Washington, DC, United States

A statue of singer-songwriter Johnny Cash is installed in the U.S. Capitol, in Washington, D.C., as part of the National Statuary Hall Collection. The sculpture was gifted by the U.S state of Arkansas replacing the statue of James P. Clarke. The statue depicts Cash with a guitar swung across his back, with him carrying a Bible in his right hand.

== See also ==
- Statues of the National Statuary Hall Collection
