= Statue of Robert M. La Follette =

Statue in the United States Capitol

Robert M. La Follette
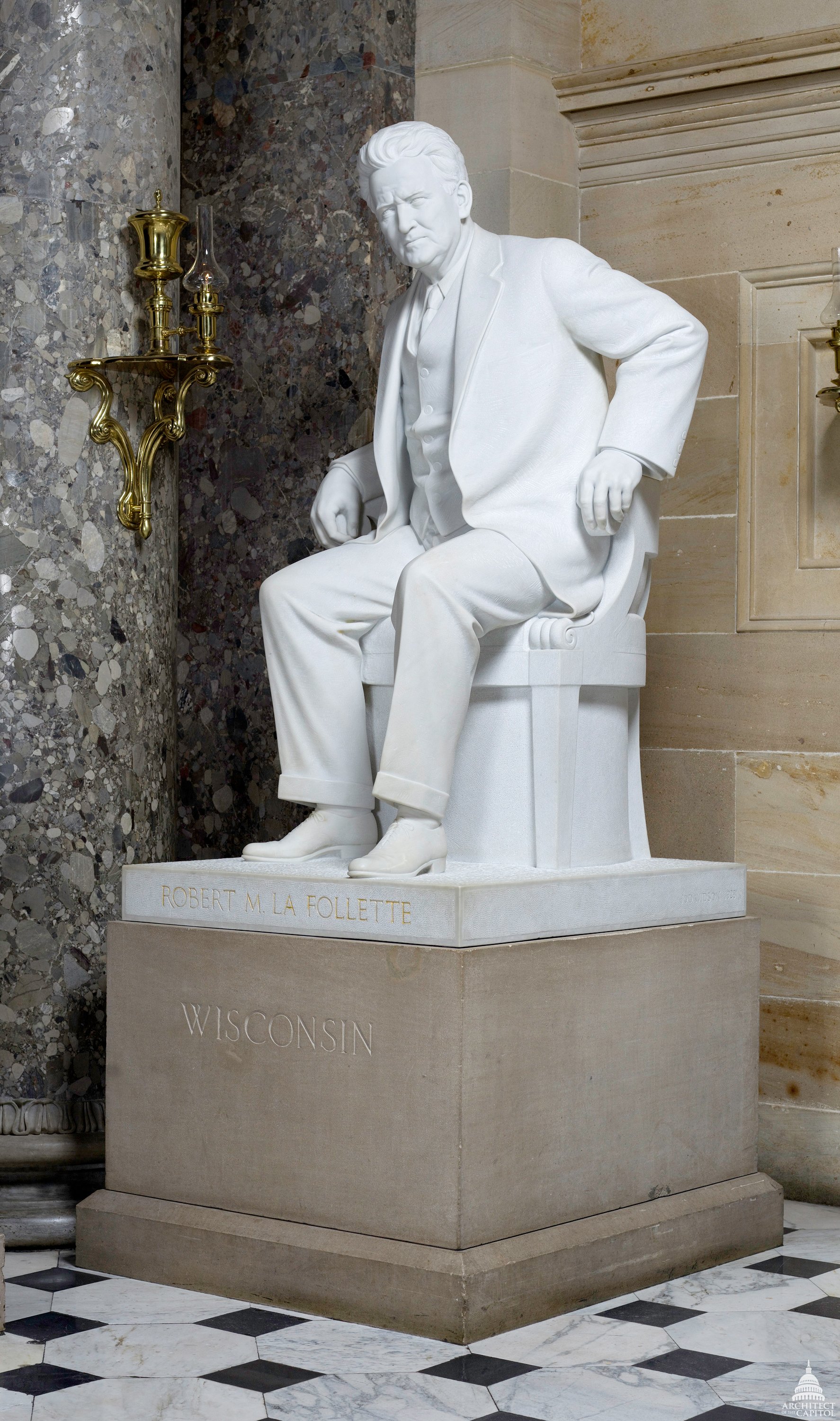
- Artist: Jo Davidson
- Year: 1929
- Medium: Marble sculpture
- Subject: Robert M. La Follette
- Location: Washington, D.C., U.S.

Robert M. La Follette Sr. is a 1929 marble sculpture of Robert M. La Follette by Jo Davidson, installed in the United States Capitol, in Washington, D.C., as part of the National Statuary Hall Collection. It is one of two statues donated by the state of Wisconsin. The statue was accepted in the collection by Senator John J. Blaine on April 25, 1929.

In 1923, the sculptor Jo Davidson had met La Follette in Paris where the Senator had sat for a bust. In his autobiography Davidson records, “The bust that I had done at that time now stood me in good stead. it helped me bring back his warm and dynamic personality…….. La Follette had not particularly like the bust…and had remarked that it was too belligerent. Accordingly, I held back.” The work took Davidson four years to complete and is one of only a handful of statues in the collection that portrays the subject sitting down. Before it was placed in the Capitol the work was exhibited in a gallery in New York for two months.

Davidson's bust of La Follette now resides in the National Portrait Gallery in Washington, D.C.

== See also ==
- 1929 in art
