= Statue of Harry S. Truman =

Statue in the United States Capitol

Harry S Truman
- Artist: Tom Corbin
- Year: 2022
- Medium: Bronze sculpture
- Subject: Harry S Truman
- Dimensions: (11 feet (including pedestal) in)
- Location: Washington, D.C., United States
- Website: The Architect of the Capitol's website

A statue of Harry S. Truman was installed in the U.S. Capitol, in Washington, D.C., on September 29, 2022, as part of the National Statuary Hall Collection. It replaced the statue of Thomas Hart Benton.
