= Statue of U. M. Rose =

Sculpture by Frederick Ruckstull

Uriah M. Rose
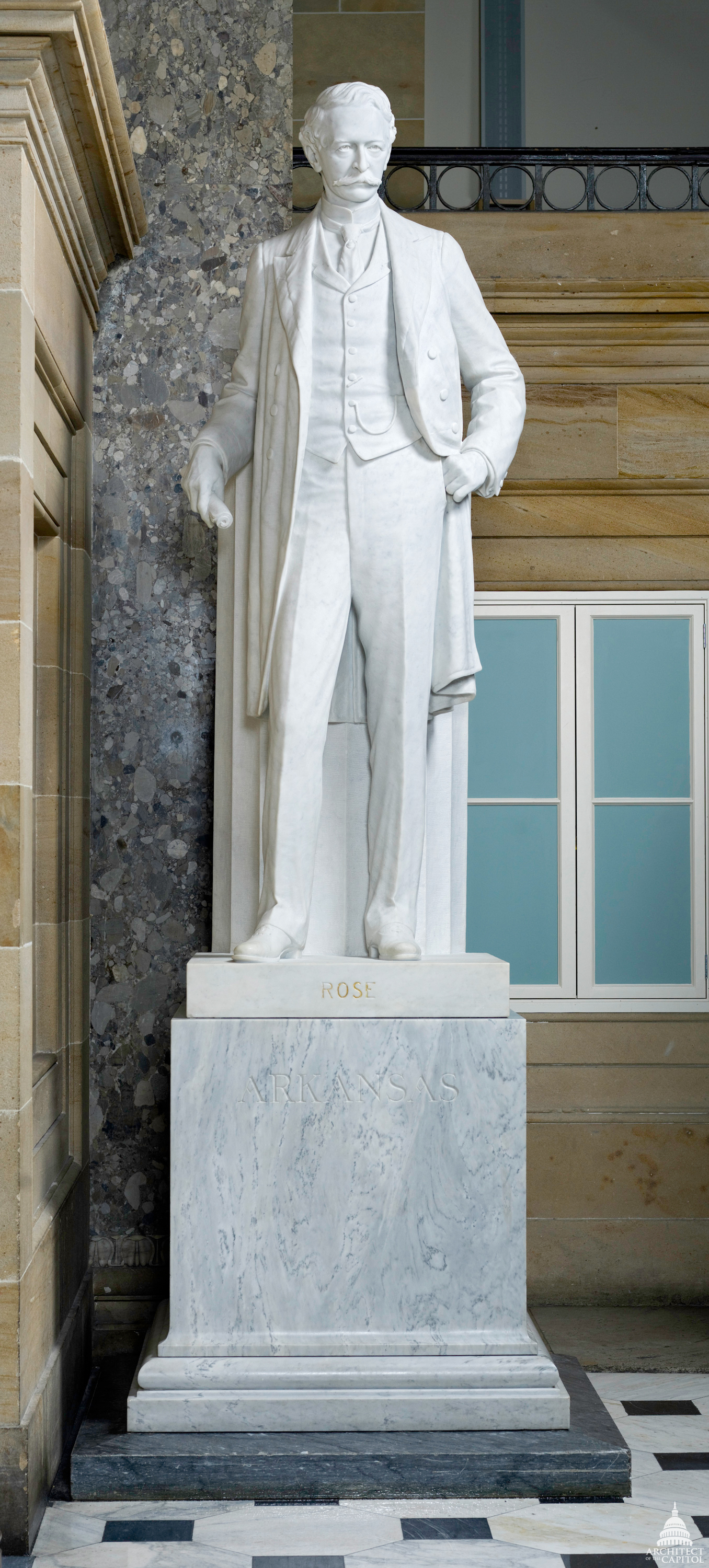
- The statue in 2011
- Artist: Frederick Ruckstull
- Medium: Marble sculpture
- Subject: Uriah M. Rose
- Location: Little Rock, Arkansas
- Owner: Rose Law Firm

Uriah M. Rose, or Uriah Milton Rose, is a marble sculpture depicting the American lawyer of the same name by Frederick Ruckstull, formerly installed in the United States Capitol's National Statuary Hall, in Washington, D.C., as part of the National Statuary Hall Collection. The statue was gifted by the U.S. state of Arkansas in 1917.

In 2019, the Arkansas legislature voted to replace both of its contributions to the collection, the statue of Rose and one of James Paul Clarke. As of January 2023, replacement statues of Daisy Bates and Johnny Cash were prepared for installation. The statue of Daisy Bates was installed in 2024. In 2025, the statue was moved to Rose's former law firm in Little Rock, Arkansas.
