= Statue of Julius Sterling Morton =

Sculpture by Rudulph Evans

Julius Sterling Morton
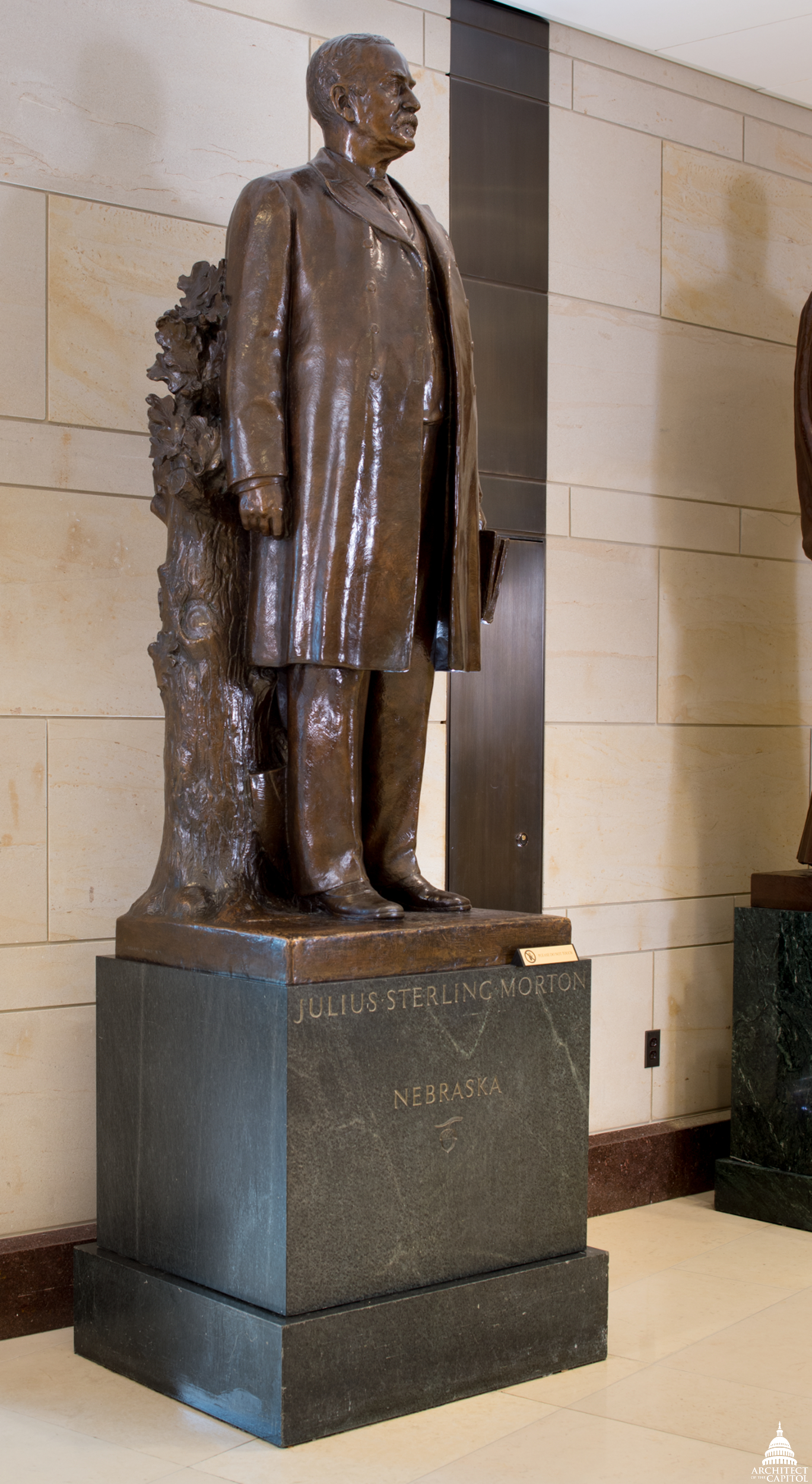
- The statue in 2016
- Artist: Rudulph Evans
- Medium: Bronze sculpture
- Subject: Julius Sterling Morton
- Location: Nebraska City, Nebraska, United States

Julius Sterling Morton, also known as J. Sterling Morton, is a 1937 bronze sculpture of Julius Sterling Morton by Rudulph Evans, installed in the United States Capitol Visitor Center, in Washington, D.C., as part of the National Statuary Hall Collection. It is one of two statues donated by the state of Nebraska. The sculpture was accepted into the collection by Congressman Karl Stefan of Nebraska on April 27, 1937.

The statue is one of two that Evans has placed in the collection, the other being William Jennings Bryan, also from Nebraska.

On March 1, 2019, it was announced the state of Nebraska will replace the statue with one of the author Willa Cather. The Morton statue arrived at the Morton James Public Library in Nebraska City, Nebraska on August 16, 2023.

== See also ==
- 1937 in art
