= Statue of John James Ingalls =

Statue formerly in the U.S. Capitol

John James Ingalls
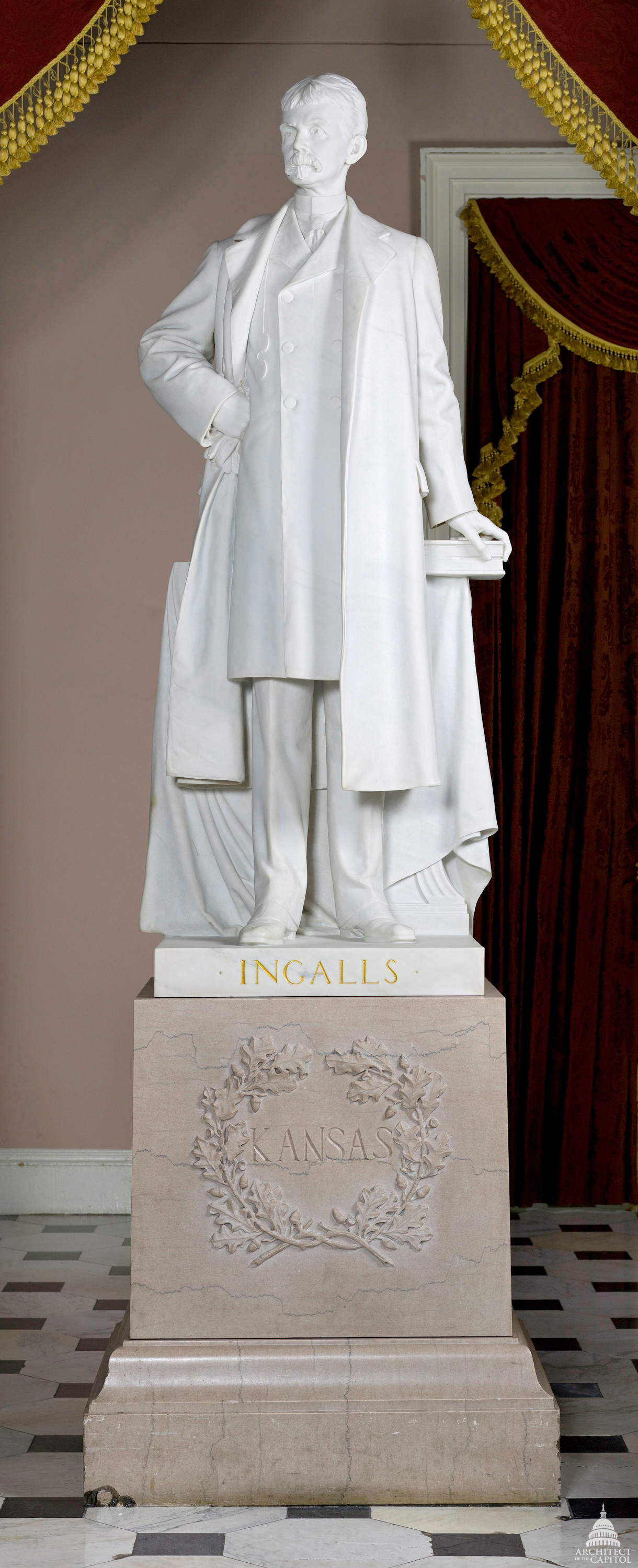
- The statue at the National Statuary Hall in 2011
- Artist: Charles Henry Niehaus
- Year: 1905
- Medium: Marble sculpture
- Subject: John J. Ingalls

John James Ingalls is a 1905 marble sculpture of the politician of the same name by Charles Henry Niehaus, formerly installed in the United States Capitol, in Washington, D.C., as part of the National Statuary Hall Collection. It was one of two statues donated by the state of Kansas. The statue was accepted in the collection by Senator Arthur P. Gorman on January 21, 1905. On July 27, 2022, it was replaced by a statue of Amelia Earhart.

== See also ==
- 1905 in art
