= Statue of Gerald Ford =

Statue in the U.S. Capitol

Gerald R. Ford
- The statue at the United States Capitol rotunda in 2023
- Artist: J. Brett Grill
- Medium: Bronze sculpture
- Subject: Gerald Ford
- Location: Washington, D.C., United States

Gerald R. Ford is a bronze sculpture of the former American president of the same name by J. Brett Grill, installed at the United States Capitol's rotunda, in Washington, D.C., as part of the National Statuary Hall Collection.

The statue was gifted by the U.S. state of Michigan in 2011, and was commissioned by the Gerald R. Ford Presidential Foundation. It replaced a statue of Zachariah Chandler which was donated in 1913. Another cast of the statue stands outside the Gerald R. Ford Presidential Museum in Grand Rapids, Michigan.

The statue in the U.S. Capitol received national attention during the January 6, 2021, storming of the Capitol, during which it was photographed wearing a Make America Great Again hat, as well as a Donald Trump 2020 presidential campaign flag.

== See also ==
- 2011 in art
- List of sculptures of presidents of the United States
