= Statue of Thomas Edison =

US Capitol National Statuary Hall statue

Thomas Edison
- Artist: Alan Cottrill
- Medium: Bronze sculpture
- Subject: Thomas Edison
- Location: Washington, D.C., United States

Thomas Edison is a bronze sculpture depicting the American inventor and businessman of the same name by Alan Cottrill, installed in the United States Capitol's National Statuary Hall, in Washington, D.C., as part of the National Statuary Hall Collection. The statue was gifted by the U.S. state of Ohio in 2016, and replaced one depicting William Allen, which had been donated in 1887.

== See also ==
- 2016 in art
- Thomas Edison in popular culture
