= Statue of Billy Graham =

Bronze sculpture in the National Statuary Hall Collection, Washington, D.C.

- The statue in 2024
- Artist: Chas Fagan
- Year: 2024
- Medium: Bronze sculpture
- Subject: Billy Graham
- Location: Washington, D.C., United States

A bronze statue of American evangelist Billy Graham is installed at the United States Capitol's crypt, in Washington, D.C., as part of the National Statuary Hall Collection. It was designed by artist Chas Fagan.

Unveiled in May 2024, the sculpture was gifted by the U.S. state of North Carolina, replacing the statue of Charles Brantley Aycock.

== History ==
On October 2, 2015, North Carolina governor Pat McCrory signed a bill replacing the statue of Charles Aycock with one of Reverend Billy Graham. However, the replacement was delayed because the statues must represent deceased individuals; Reverend Graham did not die until February 2018. One week after Graham's death, McCrory's successor, Roy Cooper, submitted a formal request for replacement of the Aycock statue. The North Carolina Statuary Hall Selection Committee issued a request for proposals for the statue indicating a desired completion date of September 2020. The statue of Billy Graham was installed in National Statuary Hall in May 2024.

== See also ==
- Statues of the National Statuary Hall Collection
