= Statue of Daisy Bates =

Bronze sculpture in the National Statuary Hall Collection, Washington, D.C.

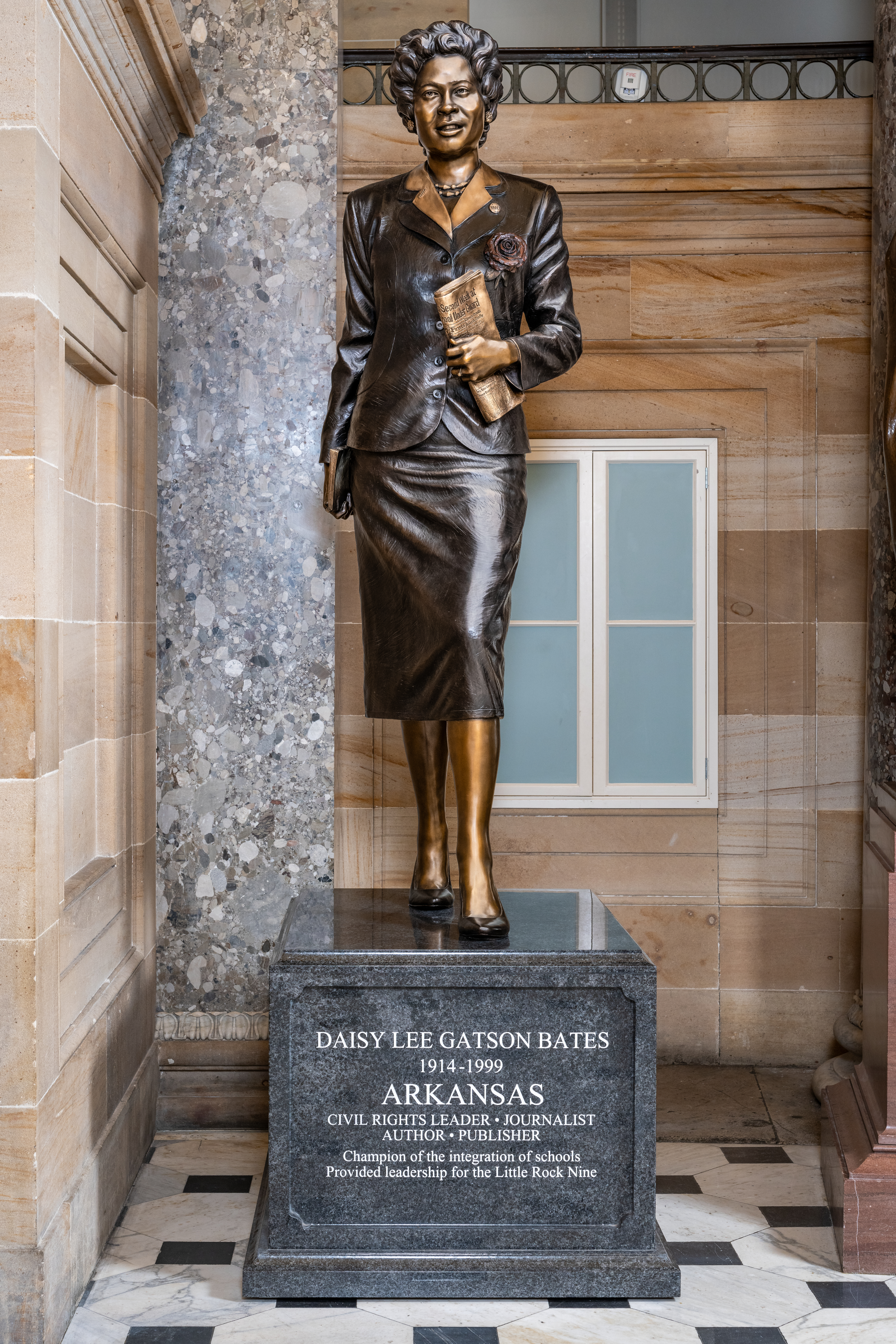
- The statue of Daisy Bates
- Artist: Benjamin Victor
- Year: 2024
- Medium: Bronze sculpture
- Subject: Daisy Bates
- Location: Washington, D.C., United States

A bronze statue of American civil rights activist Daisy Bates is installed at the United States Capitol's National Statuary Hall, in Washington, D.C., as part of the National Statuary Hall Collection. It was designed by artist Benjamin Victor. Unveiled in May 2024, the sculpture was gifted by the U.S. state of Arkansas, replacing the statue of U. M. Rose.

== See also ==
- Civil rights movement in popular culture
- Statues of the National Statuary Hall Collection
