= Statue of Willa Cather =

Part of the National Statuary Hall Collection

Willa Cather
- Artist: Littleton Alston
- Medium: Bronze sculpture
- Subject: Willa Cather
- Location: Washington, D.C., United States

In 2023, the U.S. state of Nebraska donated a bronze sculpture of Pulitzer Prize-winning author Willa Cather by Littleton Alston to the National Statuary Hall Collection. The statue is installed in the United States Capitol's Capitol Visitors Center, in Washington, D.C.

It replaces a statue of Julius Sterling Morton which was donated to the collection in 1937, but removed from it in 2023. The statue of Morton now resides in a library in Nebraska City, Nebraska.

== See also ==
- 2023 in art
