= Statue of Amelia Earhart =

Statue in the United States Capitol

Amelia Earhart
- Artist: Mark and George Lundeen
- Year: 2022
- Medium: Bronze sculpture
- Subject: Amelia Earhart
- Dimensions: (10 feet (including pedestal) in)
- Location: Washington, D.C., United States
- Website: https://www.aoc.gov/explore-capitol-campus/art/amelia-earhart-statue

Amelia Earhart, a statue honoring aviator Amelia Earhart, was unveiled in the United States Capitol in Washington, D.C., representing Kansas in the National Statuary Hall Collection on July 27, 2022.

The statue is made of bronze and was cast by brothers Mark and George Lundeen using the lost-wax process.

The statue replaced one of Kansas statesman John James Ingalls in the collection as the second representative of Kansas, after famed general and U.S. President Dwight Eisenhower.
