= Statue of Thomas Hart Benton =

Statue formerly in the U.S. Capitol

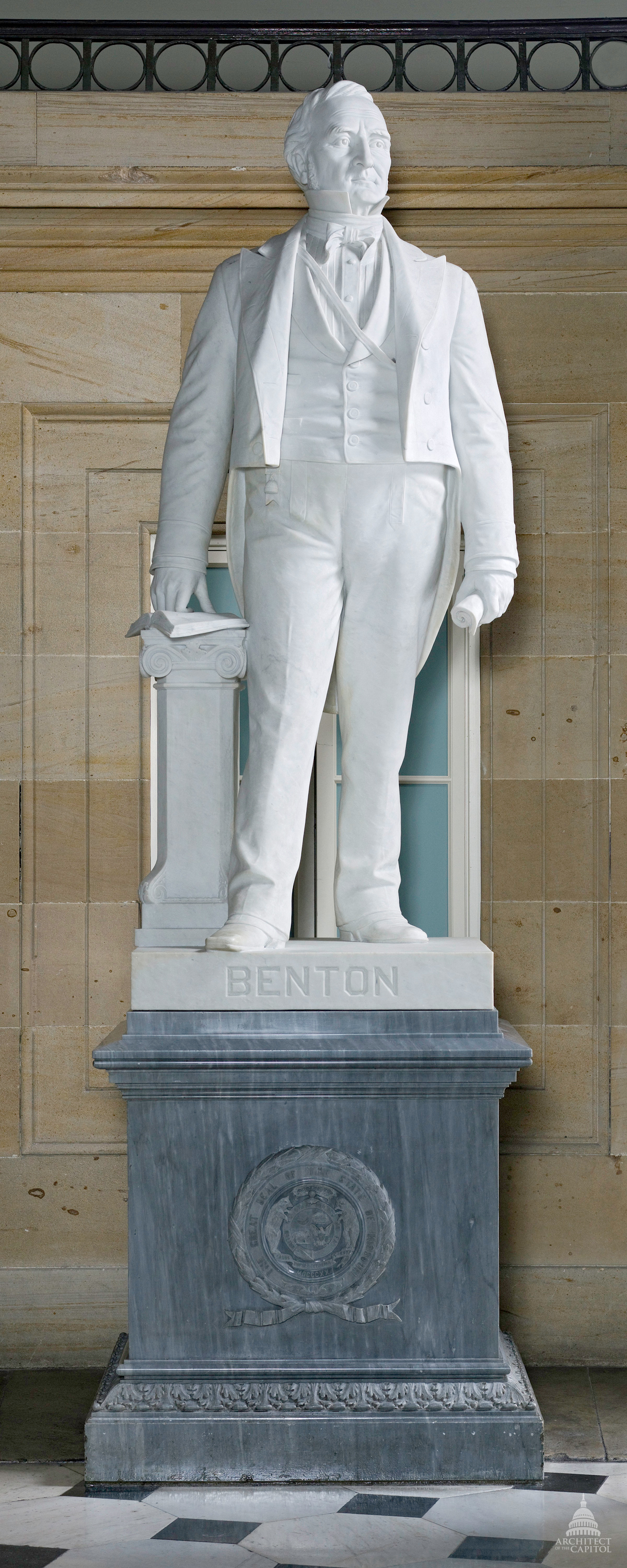
- The statue in the National Statuary Hall Collection
- Artist: Alexander Doyle
- Medium: Marble sculpture
- Subject: Thomas Hart Benton

Thomas Hart Benton is a marble sculpture depicting the Senator from Missouri of the same name by Alexander Doyle, formerly installed at the United States Capitol in Washington, D.C., as part of the National Statuary Hall Collection. The statue was gifted by the U.S. state of Missouri in 1899.
