= Statue of George Washington Glick =

George Washington Glick
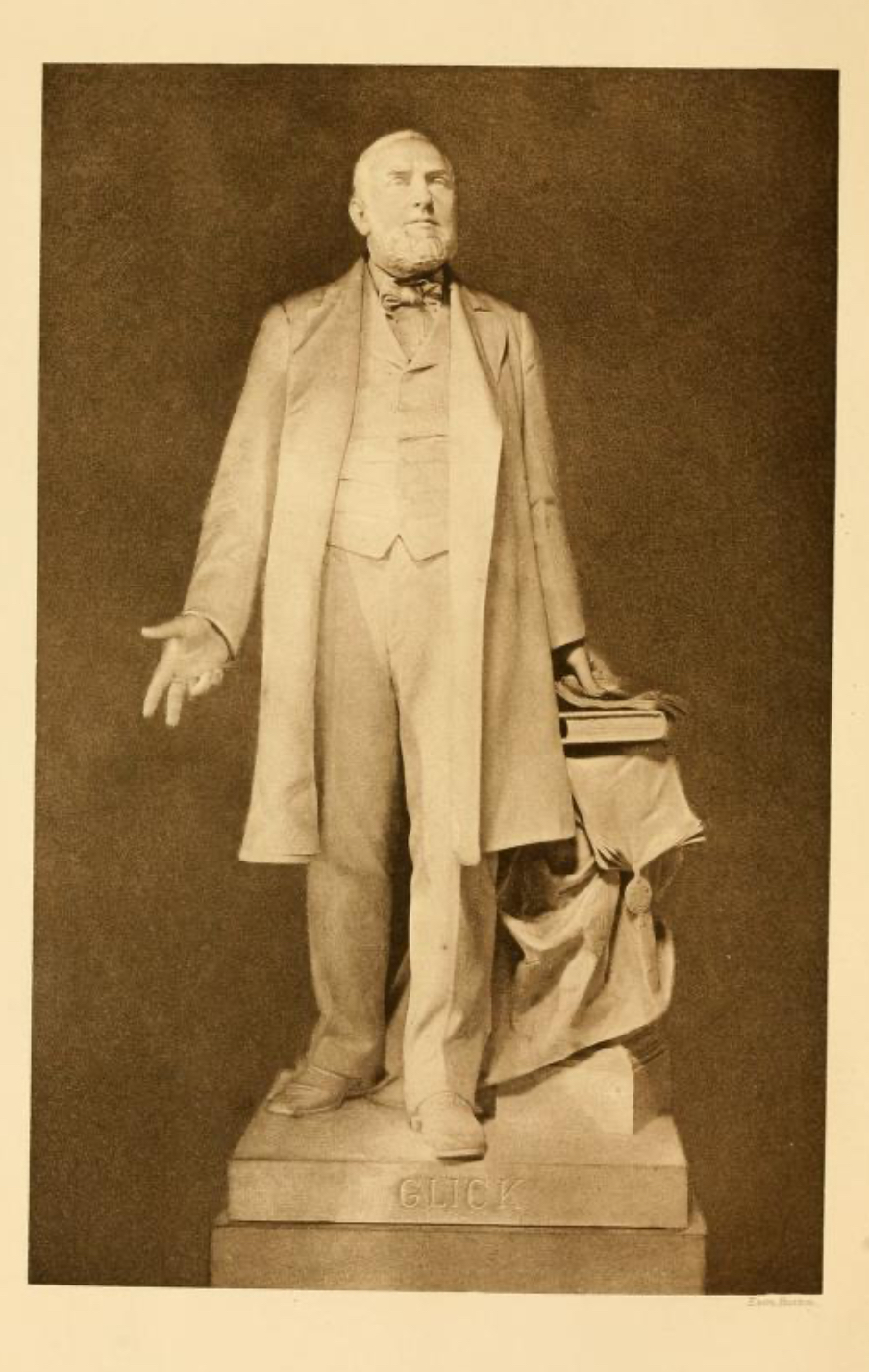
- Artist: Charles Henry Niehaus
- Medium: Marble sculpture
- Subject: George Washington Glick

George Washington Glick is a marble sculpture depicting the American politician of the same name by Charles Henry Niehaus, formerly installed in Washington, D.C. as part of the National Statuary Hall Collection. The statue, which was gifted by the U.S. state of Kansas in 1914, was replaced with one depicting Dwight D. Eisenhower in 2003.
