= Statue of Ronald Reagan (U.S. Capitol) =

Statue by Chas Fagan

Ronald Reagan
- The statue in the National Statuary Hall Collection
- Year: 2009
- Medium: Bronze sculpture
- Subject: Ronald Reagan
- Location: Washington, D.C., United States

Ronald Reagan is a bronze sculpture depicting the American politician of the same name by Chas Fagan, installed at the United States Capitol's rotunda, in Washington, D.C., as part of the National Statuary Hall Collection. The statue was donated by the U.S. state of California in 2009, and replaced one depicting Thomas Starr King, which the state had gifted in 1931. The statue stands on top of fragments from the Berlin Wall.

== See also ==
- 2009 in art
- Cultural depictions of Ronald Reagan
- List of sculptures of presidents of the United States
