= Statue of Barbara Rose Johns =

Statue in the U.S. Capitol

- The statue at the United States Capitol crypt
- Artist: Steven Weitzman
- Year: 2025
- Type: Statue
- Medium: Bronze
- Subject: Barbara Rose Johns
- Location: United States Capitol, Washington, D.C., U.S.

A statue of American civil rights activist Barbara Rose Johns by Steven Weitzman was gifted by the U.S. state of Virginia, to be installed at the United States Capitol, in Washington, D.C., in 2025, alongside the statue of George Washington, also representing Virginia.

== See also ==
- Statues of the National Statuary Hall Collection
- Civil rights movement in popular culture
