= National Statuary Hall Collection =

Collection of statues in the US Capitol

Coordinates: 38°53′23″N 77°00′32″W

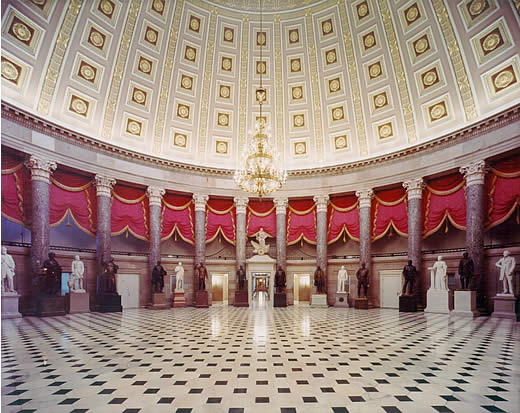
Part of the National Statuary Hall Collection.

The National Statuary Hall Collection in the United States Capitol is composed of statues donated by individual states to honor persons notable in their history. Limited to two statues per state, the collection was originally set up in the old Hall of the House of Representatives, which was then renamed National Statuary Hall. The expanding collection has since been spread throughout the Capitol and its visitor center.

With the addition of New Mexico's second statue in 2005, the collection is complete with 100 statues contributed by 50 states, plus two from the District of Columbia (see Statues of the National Statuary Hall Collection). Since Congress authorized replacements in 2000, fourteen states have replaced at least one of their original two statues. In 2022, Kansas became the first state to replace both of its statues; it has been joined by Arkansas and Nebraska.

== History ==
The concept of a National Statuary Hall originated in the middle of the nineteenth century, before the completion of the present House wing in 1857. At that time, the House of Representatives moved into its new larger chamber and the old vacant chamber became a thoroughfare between the Rotunda and the House wing. Suggestions for the use of the chamber were made as early as 1853 by Gouverneur Kemble, a former member of the House, who pressed for its use as a gallery of historical paintings. The space between the columns seemed too limited for this purpose, but it was well suited for the display of busts and statuary.

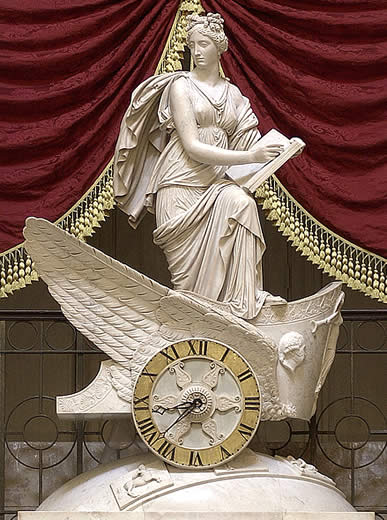
Presiding over the Hall, Carlo Franzoni's 1819 sculptural chariot clock, the Car of History depicts Clio, the Greek muse of history.

On April 19, 1864, Representative Justin S. Morrill asked: "To what end more useful or grand, and at the same time simple and inexpensive, can we devote it [the Chamber] than to ordain that it shall be set apart for the reception of such statuary as each State shall elect to be deserving of in this lasting commemoration?" His proposal to create a National Statuary Hall became law on July 2, 1864:

[...] the President is hereby authorized to invite each and all the States to provide and furnish statues, in marble or bronze, not exceeding two in number for each State, of deceased persons who have been citizens thereof, and illustrious for their historic renown or for distinguished civic or military services such as each State may deem to be worthy of this national commemoration; and when so furnished the same shall be placed in the Old Hall of the House of Representatives, in the Capitol of the United States, which is set apart, or so much thereof as may be necessary, as a national statuary hall for the purpose herein indicated.

Originally, all state statues were placed in National Statuary Hall. However, the aesthetic appearance of the Hall began to suffer from overcrowding until, in 1933, the situation became unbearable. At that time the Hall held 65 statues, which stood, in some cases, three deep. More important, the structure of the chamber would not support the weight of any more statues. Therefore, in 1933 Congress passed a resolution that:

the Architect of the Capitol, upon the approval of the Joint Committee on the Library, with the advice of the Commission of Fine Arts, is hereby authorized and directed to relocate within the Capitol any of the statues already received and placed in Statuary Hall, and to provide for the reception and location of the statues received hereafter from the States.

Under authority of this resolution it was decided that only one statue from each state should be placed in Statuary Hall. The others would be given prominent locations in designated areas and corridors of the Capitol. A second rearrangement of the statues was made in 1976 by authorization of the Joint Committee on the Library. To improve the crowded appearance of the collection, thirty-eight statues were rearranged in Statuary Hall according to height and material. Statues representing ten of the thirteen original colonies were moved to the Central Hall of the East Front Extension on the first floor of the Capitol. The remainder of the statues were distributed throughout the Capitol, mainly in the Hall of Columns and the connecting corridors of the House and Senate wings. Legislation was introduced in 2005 that would authorize the collection to include one statue from each U.S. Territory; it did not pass.

Each statue is the gift of a state, not of an individual or group of citizens. Proceedings for the donation of a statue usually begin in the state legislature with the enactment of a resolution that names the citizen to be commemorated and cites their qualifications, specifies a committee or commission to represent the state in selecting the sculptor, and provides for a method of obtaining the necessary funds to carry the resolution into effect. In recent years, the statues have been unveiled during ceremonies in the Rotunda and displayed there for up to six months. They are then moved to a permanent location approved by the Joint Committee on the Library. An act of Congress (2 U.S.C. § 2132), enacted in 2000, permits states to provide replacements and repossess the earlier one.

A special act of Congress, Pub. L. 109–116 (text) (PDF), signed on December 1, 2005, directed the Joint Committee on the Library to obtain a statue of Rosa Parks and to place the statue in the United States Capitol in National Statuary Hall in a suitable permanent location. On February 27, 2013, Parks became the first African-American woman to have her likeness in the Hall. Though located in Statuary Hall, Parks' statue is not part of the Collection; neither Alabama (her birth state) nor Michigan (where she lived most of her later years) commissioned it, and both states are represented in the Collection by other statues.

In 2002, Delegate Eleanor Holmes Norton introduced a bill in Congress to allow the District of Columbia to place two statues in the collection, in parity with the 50 states. While the bill was not enacted, the district commissioned two statues, one of abolitionist Frederick Douglass, the other of D.C. master planner Pierre L'Enfant, and housed them in One Judiciary Square in hopes of eventually placing them in the Capitol. A 2010 version of the bill to accept D.C.'s statues stalled after House Republicans began adding amendments in an attempt to soften D.C.'s gun laws. A 2012 compromise bill led to the placement of the statue of Douglass, but not L'Enfant, on June 19, 2013. Norton continued to pursue legislation to move the second statue to the Capitol. The statue of L'Enfant was later placed in the Capitol in February 2022.

Amid national debates about Confederate statues and monuments, Democrats in Congress introduced bills in 2017 to remove statues of people who served in the Confederacy from the National Statuary Hall Collection, but the legislation made no progress. Alabama, Florida, Arkansas, and Virginia have passed resolutions to remove statues of individuals with Confederate ties, although Alabama retained a second statue of a Confederate veteran. North Carolina and Arkansas have authorized replacing statues of Jim Crow-era politicians with racist views.

== Demographics ==
=== Women ===
There are fifteen statues of women in the collection:

- Daisy Bates (Arkansas)
- Mary McLeod Bethune (Florida)
- Martha Hughes Cannon (Utah)
- Willa Cather (Nebraska)
- Amelia Earhart (Kansas)
- Barbara Rose Johns (Virginia)
- Mother Joseph (Washington), a native of Canada.
- Helen Keller (Alabama)
- Esther Hobart Morris (Wyoming)
- Jeannette Rankin (Montana), the first woman elected to the House and, famously, the only Member of Congress to vote against U.S. entry into both World Wars.
- Florence R. Sabin (Colorado)
- Sacagawea (North Dakota), one of seven Native Americans represented in the collection.
- Maria Sanford (Minnesota)
- Frances E. Willard (Illinois), the first statue of a woman in the collection, was also sculpted by a woman, Helen Farnsworth Mears.
- Sarah Winnemucca (Nevada), one of seven Native Americans represented in the collection.

The statue of Rosa Parks in the Capitol does not represent a state and "is not a part of the National Statuary Hall Collection."

=== Native Hawaiian and Native American members ===
The collection includes statues of Hawaiian king Kamehameha I and of seven Native Americans: Po'pay (New Mexico), Will Rogers (Oklahoma), Sequoyah (Oklahoma), Sacagawea (North Dakota), Washakie (Wyoming), Sarah Winnemucca (Nevada), and Standing Bear (Nebraska). Washington has authorized a statue of Billy Frank Jr.

=== Members of Hispanic descent ===
Dionisio "Dennis" Chávez, the first person of Hispanic descent to be elected to a full term in the U.S. Senate, represents New Mexico. Saint Junípero Serra, born in Spain, was a Spanish-era founder of the California mission system.

=== African American members ===
Until 2018, no state had designated an African American as one of its two statues. As of 2025, there are three statues of African Americans in the collection.

In February 2013, a statue of Rosa Parks was placed as the first full-length statue of an African American in the Capitol. It did not represent a particular state, but was commissioned directly by Congress. A few months later, on Juneteenth, 2013, a statue of Frederick Douglass was placed in the Capitol Visitor Center as a gift of the District of Columbia. There are also busts of Martin Luther King Jr. (1986) and Sojourner Truth (2009).

In March 2018, Florida Governor Rick Scott signed legislation to replace the statue of Edmund Kirby Smith with one of African American educator and civil rights activist Mary McLeod Bethune. The new statue was unveiled July 13, 2022. In April 2019, Arkansas also authorized a statue of Daisy Bates, which was installed in May 2024. In December 2020, Virginia Governor Ralph Northam announced that the statue of Confederate General Robert E. Lee would be replaced by a statue of African American civil rights activist Barbara Johns. Johns's statue was officially unveiled on December 16, 2025.

=== Catholic clergy and nun ===
The collection includes Father Damien from Hawaiʻi, Father Jacques Marquette from Wisconsin, Father Junipero Serra from California, Father Eusebio Kino from Arizona, and Mother Joseph Pariseau from Washington.

=== Confederates ===
The collection contains several statues of leaders of the Confederate States of America. These include CSA President Jefferson Davis and Vice President Alexander Stephens and Confederate soldiers, most in Confederate Army uniforms: Generals Joseph Wheeler, James Z. George, Wade Hampton III, as well as Colonel Zebulon Baird Vance and former enlisted soldiers John E. Kenna and Edward Douglass White.

Alabama replaced its statue of Confederate politician and army officer Jabez Curry in 2009. In 2018 the Florida legislature voted to replace its statue of Confederate general Edmund Kirby Smith with a statue of African American educator and Civil Rights activist Mary McLeod Bethune; Smith's statue was removed in 2021 ahead of the unveiling of Bethune's statue in 2022. In 2019, Arkansas decided to replace both its statues, including the one of Uriah M. Rose, "an attorney who sided with the Confederacy" and was the chancellor of Pulaski County, Arkansas, while Arkansas was part of the Confederacy, with civil rights activist Daisy Bates and Johnny Cash. In 2020, Virginia decided to replace its statue of Robert E. Lee, which had stood in the collection since 1909, with one of Barbara Rose Johns; the Lee statue was removed December 20–21, 2020.

== Replacement of statues ==
A 2000 change in the law allows a state to remove a previously placed statue from the collection and replace it with another. Since then, fourteen states have replaced statues and other states have either considered or passed legislation calling for replacing one or both of their statues.

=== Replacements ===
- Alabama replaced its statue of Jabez Curry in 2009 with one of Helen Keller. The Curry statue is now in the Alabama Department of Archives and History in Montgomery.
- Arizona replaced its statue of John Campbell Greenway in 2015 with one of Barry Goldwater. The Greenway statue is now at the Polly Rosenbaum Archives and History Building near the Arizona State Capitol in Phoenix.
- Arkansas replaced its statue of U. M. Rose with one of Daisy Bates, and its statue of James P. Clarke with one depicting musician Johnny Cash, both in 2024.
- California replaced its statue of Thomas Starr King with one of Ronald Reagan in 2009. The King statue now stands in Capitol Park at the California State Capitol in Sacramento.
- Florida replaced its statue of Confederate General Edmund Kirby Smith with one of the African-American civil rights activist and educator Mary McLeod Bethune on July 13, 2022, pursuant to a 2018 state law. The Smith statue was to have been moved to the Lake County Historical Museum in Tavares, after residents of St. Augustine, his birthplace, expressed no interest. However, at a County Commission meeting on July 24, 2018, about 24 residents spoke against, and none in favor, of bringing the statue to Lake County. Chairman Sullivan assured the crowd that the commission would tell the Historical Museum "that there is no longer a want or desire to bring this statue to Lake County".
- Iowa replaced its statue of James Harlan in 2014 with one of Norman Borlaug, who is considered the founder of the Green Revolution. The Harlan statue is now displayed at Iowa Wesleyan College in Mount Pleasant, Iowa.
- Kansas replaced its statue of George Washington Glick with one of Dwight D. Eisenhower in 2003. The Glick statue now resides at the Kansas State Historical Society in Topeka. Almost 20 years later, in 2022, the Kansas legislature approved replacing the statue of John James Ingalls with one of female aviation pioneer Amelia Earhart in the same 1999 resolution that authorized replacing their statue of George Washington Glick with one of Eisenhower, but progress on the project was stalled by funding and paperwork delays. The Ingalls statue was replaced overnight on July 26 and the Earhart statue was unveiled on July 27 of the same year. It is unknown what will happen with the Ingalls statue.
- Michigan replaced its statue of Zachariah Chandler with one of Gerald Ford in 2011. The Chandler statue is now in the atrium of Constitution Hall in Lansing, Michigan.
- Missouri: In 2002, Governor Bob Holden signed a resolution to add a statue of President Harry S. Truman to the collection, but nothing happened for years after the state's request to the Architect of the Capitol was improperly filed. In 2019 a new resolution for a Truman statue passed the state senate and was forwarded to the Missouri House. The Truman Library Institute commissioned Kansas City sculptor Tom Corbin to create the statue, with a target completion date of 2020, the 75th anniversary of Truman's inauguration. It was finally installed in September 2022, replacing the statue of Thomas Hart Benton. Benton's statue was moved to the State Historical Society of Missouri in Columbia.
- Nebraska: In 2018, the Nebraska legislature passed LB 807, calling for the replacement of both of the state's statues, which date to 1937. It replaced Its statue of William Jennings Bryan with one of Ponca Chief Standing Bear. The Standing Bear statue is the work of Ben Victor, who created two similar statues of the chief that were previously installed in Nebraska, and was installed in September 2019. The Bryan statue was relocated to the Nebraska National Guard Museum in Seward, Nebraska. In 2023, a statue of author Willa Cather was installed, replacing a statue of Julius Sterling Morton. Its sculptor, Littleton Alston, is the first Black sculptor to create a statue for the National Statuary Hall Collection. The Morton statue was relocated to a library in Nebraska City, Nebraska.
- North Carolina: On October 2, 2015, North Carolina governor Pat McCrory signed a bill replacing the statue of Charles Aycock with one of Reverend Billy Graham. However, the replacement was delayed because the statues must represent deceased individuals; Reverend Graham did not die until February 2018. One week after Graham's death, McCrory's successor, Roy Cooper, submitted a formal request for replacement of the Aycock statue. The North Carolina Statuary Hall Selection Committee issued a request for proposals for the statue indicating a desired completion date of September 2020. The statue of Billy Graham was installed in National Statuary Hall in May 2024.
- Ohio replaced its statue of senator and governor William Allen with a statue of inventor and businessman Thomas Edison in 2016. Allen's statue was returned to his hometown of Chillicothe.
- Utah: On April 4, 2018, Governor Gary Herbert signed legislation replacing its statue of Philo Farnsworth with a statue sculpted by Ben Hammond of Martha Hughes Cannon, the first woman elected as a state senator in US history. The statue of Martha Hughes Cannon was installed on December 12, 2024.
- Virginia: In December 2020, a state commission suggested that Governor Ralph Northam replace Virginia's statue of Robert E. Lee with one of civil rights activist Barbara Johns. The statue of Lee was quickly removed later that month, on December 21. Sculpted by Steven Weitzman, the statue of Johns was officially unveiled in the Capitol Building's Emancipation Hall on December 16, 2025.

=== Replacement pending ===
- Maine: On June 12, 2025, the Maine State Legislature approved and Governor Janet Mills signed a resolution replacing the statues of Vice President Hannibal Hamlin and Governor William King with statues of Senator Margaret Chase Smith and General Joshua Chamberlain.
- Michigan: On December 6, 2022, the Michigan Legislature adopted a resolution to replace the state's statue of Lewis Cass with a statue of Coleman Young, the first Black mayor of Detroit.
- Washington: Governor Jay Inslee signed a bill in April 2021 that starts the process to replace Washington's Marcus Whitman statue with one of Billy Frank Jr. The design of the new statue, created by Hai Ying Wu, was unveiled in January 2024. Delivery of the completed statue to the Capitol is planned for September 2026.
- West Virginia: On October 10, 2024, the West Virginia State Legislature passed a resolution to replace the statue of John Kenna with a statue of Herschel "Woody" Williams, the last surviving Medal of Honor recipient from World War II.

=== Considered for replacement ===
- California: A resolution to replace California's statue of Junípero Serra with one of astronaut Sally Ride passed the state senate in April 2015, but the vote in the state assembly was placed on hold as the date for Serra's canonization as a saint approached. Governor Jerry Brown declared in July 2015 that the Serra statue would stay in the Capitol "until the end of time."
- New Jersey: A bill to replace New Jersey's statue of Philip Kearny with one of suffragist Alice Paul passed the state Senate on February 10, 2020.
- New York: In March 2025, Governor Kathy Hochul included a proposal to replace the statue of Robert Livingston with a statue of abolitionist Harriet Tubman in her State of the State Address.
- Oregon: In 2013, the Oregon House of Representatives voted 36-22 in a bipartisan effort to add a statue of Senator Mark Hatfield, replacing the statue of pioneer missionary Jason Lee, which would have been relocated to Salem. The effort failed as the bill was never introduced in the Oregon State Senate. In 2014, Governor John Kitzhaber established a "Statuary Hall Study Commission" tasked with making recommendations on updating the state's statues. They unanimously decided on a recommendation relocate the statue of Lee and the statue of John McLoughlin to "places of honor" in Oregon and replace them with statues of Chief Joseph and Abigail Scott Duniway. This never occurred. In 2016 and 2017, 3 house bills and 1 senate bill were introduced to replace the statues. All of these bills were voted down.

=== Rejected replacements ===
- Maryland: In 2011, a citizens' petition was rejected by the Maryland General Assembly. The petition requested that a statue of Harriet Tubman replace John Hanson, the 1781 President of the Continental Congress and a merchant slaveholder.

== See also ==
- Hall of Fame for Great Americans
- List of artwork at the United States Capitol complex
- United States Capitol art
- United States Senate Vice Presidential Bust Collection
