= Statue of Jeannette Rankin =

Statue by Terry Mimnaugh

Jeannette Rankin
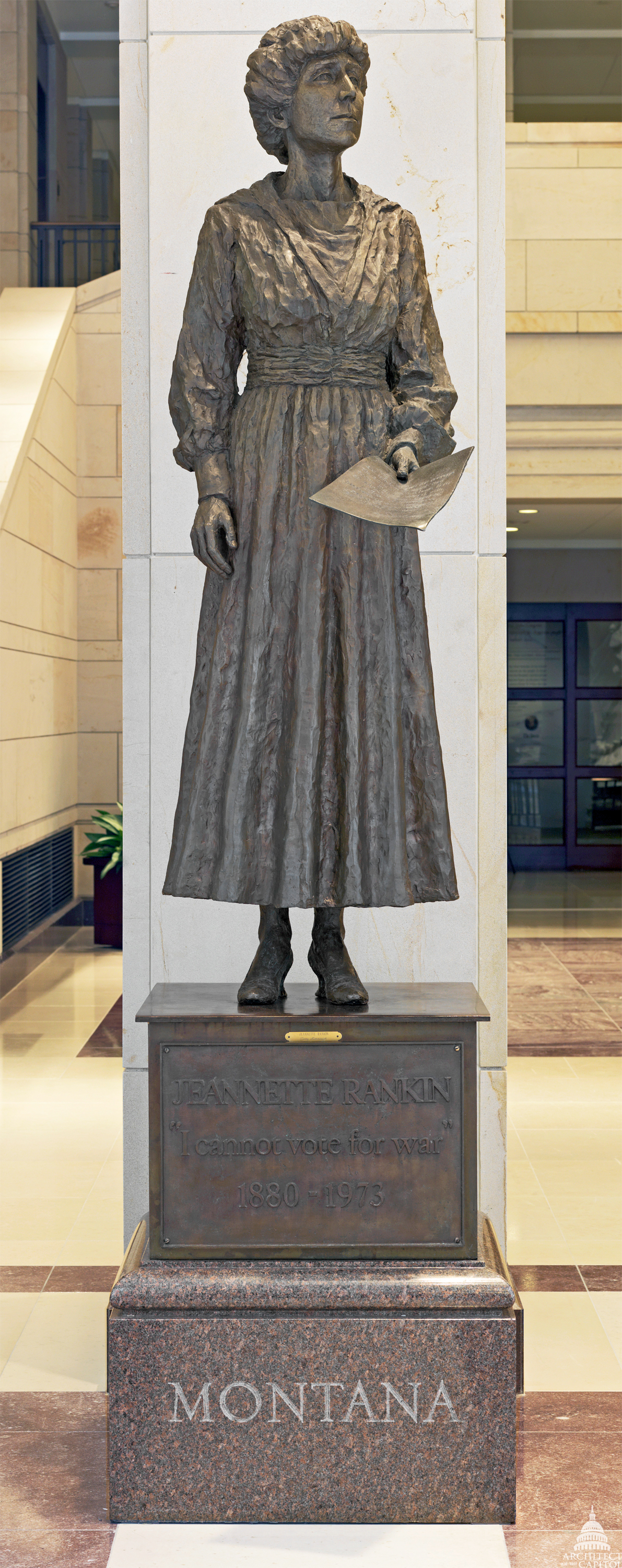
- The sculpture in the United States Capitol Visitor Center's Emancipation Hall, 2011
- Artist: Terry Mimnaugh
- Medium: Bronze sculpture
- Subject: Jeannette Rankin
- Location: Washington, D.C., United States

Jeannette Rankin is a bronze sculpture depicting the American politician and women's rights advocate of the same name by Terry Mimnaugh, installed in the United States Capitol Visitor Center's Emancipation Hall, in Washington, D.C., as part of the National Statuary Hall Collection. The statue was gifted by the U.S. state of Montana in 1985.

== See also ==
- 1985 in art
