= Statue of James Paul Clarke =

Statue formerly in the U.S. Capitol

James Paul Clarke
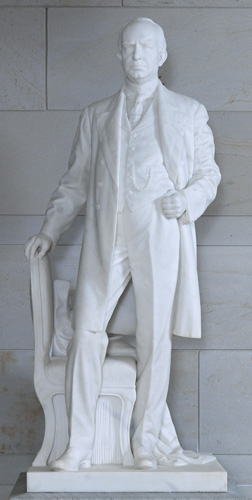
- The sculpture in the National Statuary Hall Collection
- Artist: Pompeo Coppini
- Medium: Marble sculpture
- Subject: James Paul Clarke

James Paul Clarke is a marble sculpture depicting the American politician of the same name by Pompeo Coppini, installed in the United States Capitol's National Statuary Hall Collection, in Washington, D.C., as one of two statues gifted by the U.S. state of Arkansas. The 6-foot-10-inch-tall (2.08 m) statue was placed in the hall in 1921. The work cost $7,500. and was unveiled in Washington in 1921. In 2024, the statue was removed and replaced with a statue of Johnny Cash.

== See also ==
- 1921 in art
