= Statue of Zachariah Chandler =

Statue formerly in the U.S. Capitol

Zachariah Chandler
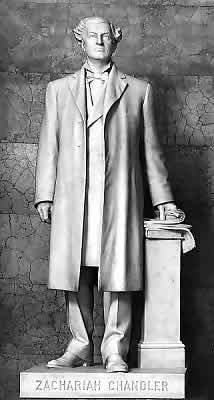
- Artist: Charles Henry Niehaus
- Subject: Zachariah Chandler
- Location: Lansing, Michigan, U.S.

Zachariah Chandler is a statue depicting the politician of the same name by Charles Henry Niehaus, formerly installed in Washington, D.C., representing the U.S. state of Michigan in the National Statuary Hall Collection. The statue was unveiled in that Hall on June 30, 1913. In 2011, the statue was relocated to the atrium of Lansing's Constitution Hall, and replaced by another depicting Gerald Ford.
