= Statue of William Allen =

William Allen
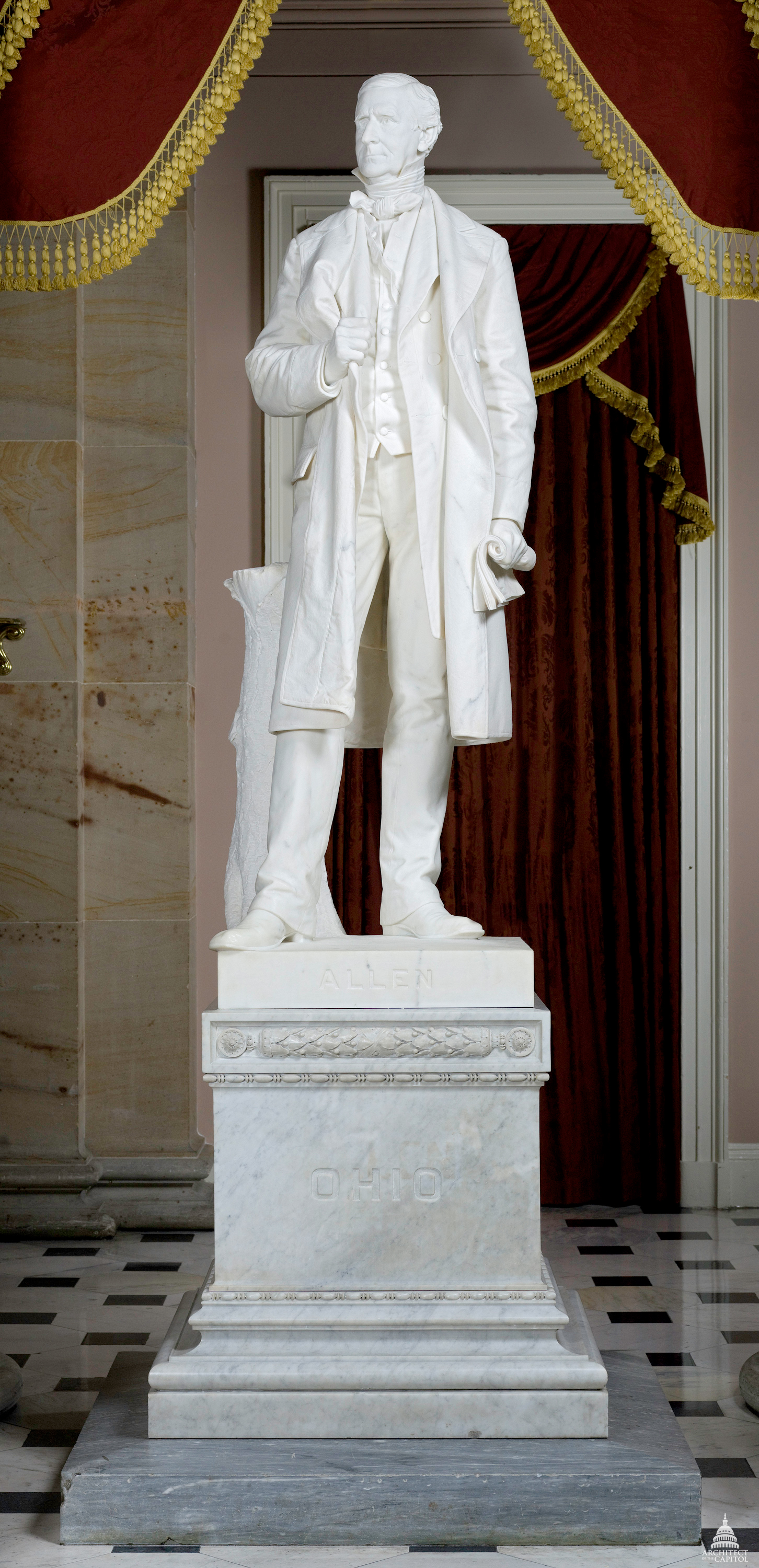
- The statue in 2011
- Artist: Charles Henry Niehaus
- Subject: William Allen
- Location: Chillicothe, Ohio, United States

William Allen is a sculpture depicting the American politician of the same name by Charles Henry Niehaus. The statue was gifted by the U.S. state of Ohio to the National Statuary Hall Collection in 1887, but later replaced with one of Thomas Edison due to Allen's pro-slavery viewpoints. Allen's statue was relocated to the Ross County Heritage Center, in Chillicothe, Ohio.

== See also ==
- 1887 in art
