= Marble sculpture =

Three-dimensional art form from marble

Marble Sculpture
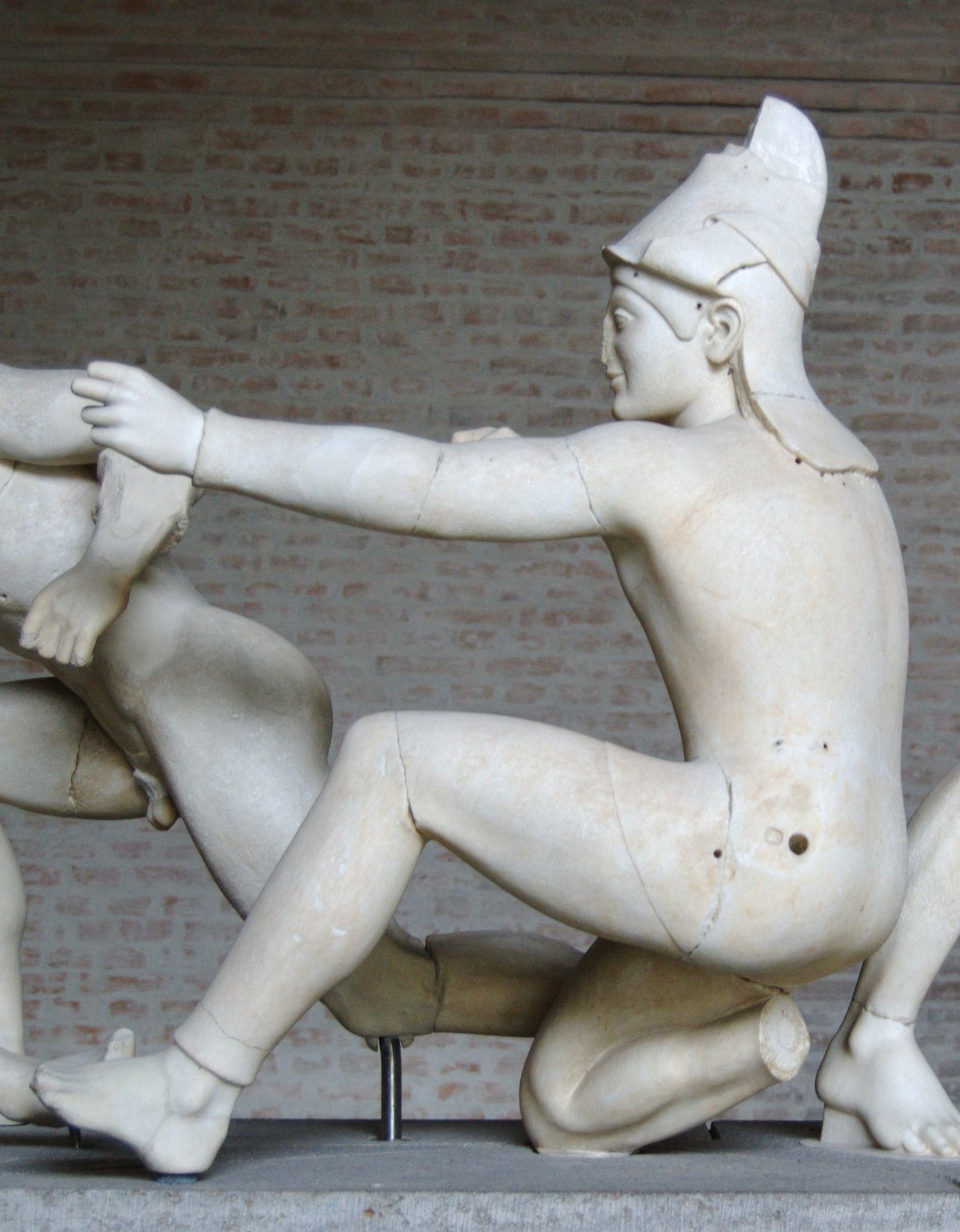
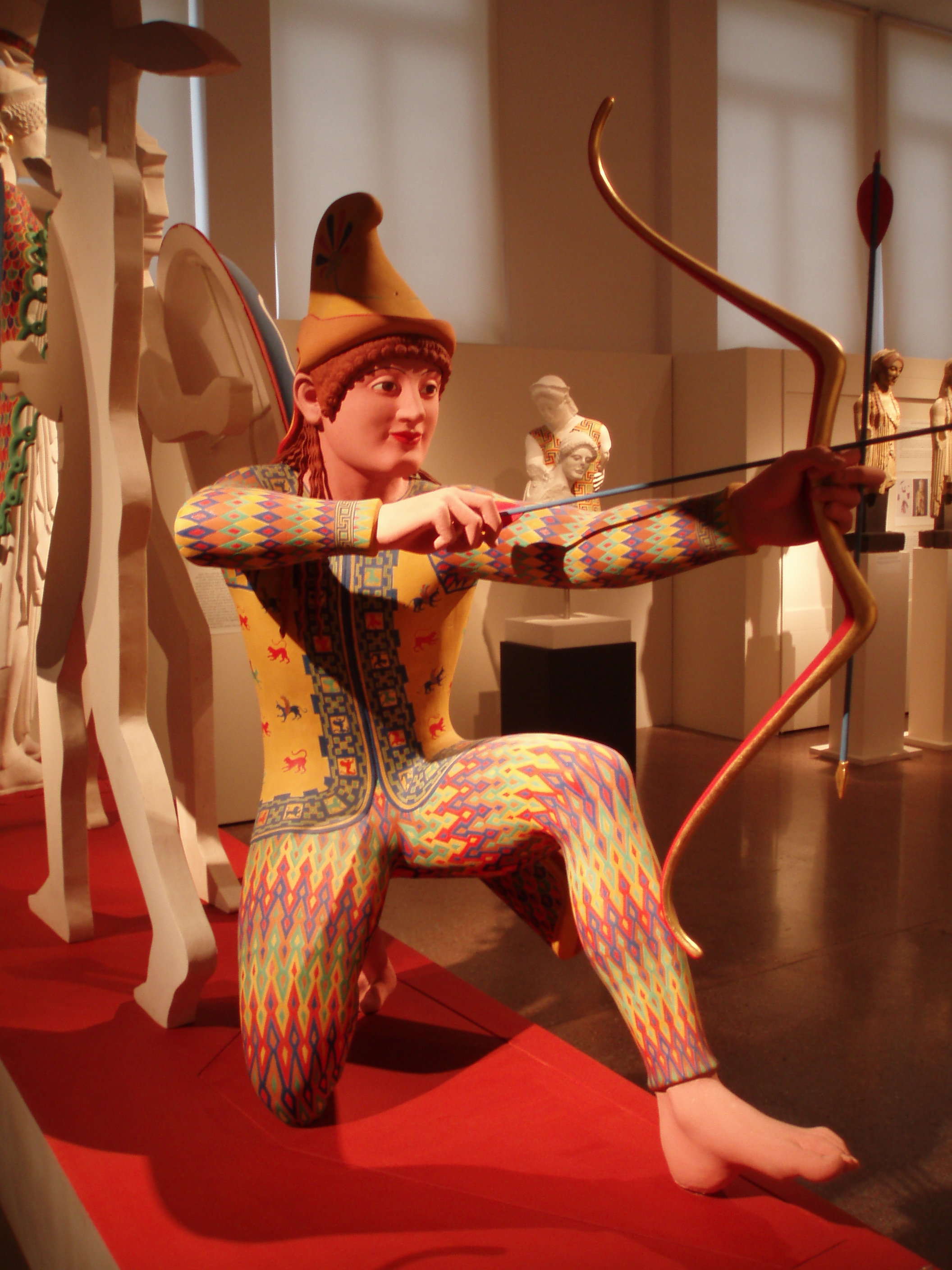
An ancient Greek marble Trojan archer sculpture from the Temple of Aphaia missing original paint (left), and a re-creation of the same polychromy sculpture based on archaeological remnants of paint found on the marble surface (right) Most ancient European marble sculptures were painted.

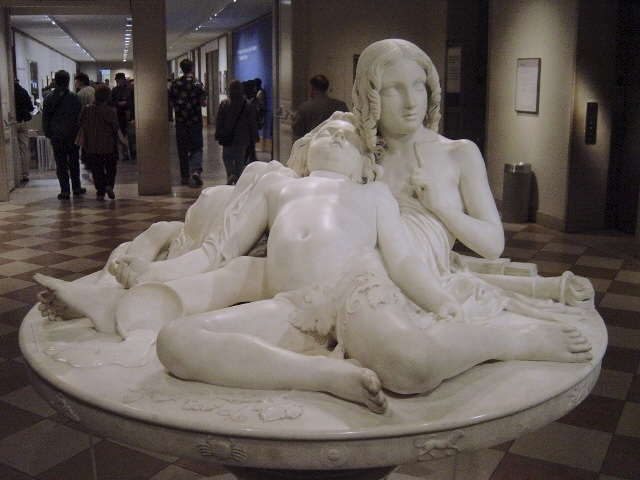
Lorenzo Bartolini, (Italian, 1777–1850), La Table aux Amours (The Demidoff Table), Metropolitan Museum of Art, New York City, Marble sculpture

Marble has been the preferred material for stone monumental sculpture since ancient times, with several advantages over its more common geological "parent" limestone, in particular the ability to absorb light a small distance into the surface before refracting it in subsurface scattering. This gives an attractive soft appearance which is especially good for representing human skin, and which can also be polished.

Of the many different types of marble the pure white ones are generally used for sculpture, with coloured ones preferred for many architectural and decorative uses. The degree of hardness is right to carve without too much difficulty, but still give a very durable result, if not exposed to acid rain or seawater.

Famous individual types and quarries include from classical times Parian marble from Paros, used for the Venus de Milo and many other Ancient Greek sculptures, and Pentelic marble, from near Athens, used for most of the Parthenon sculptures, and by the Romans. Carrara marble from northern Italy was used by the Romans, and very extensively up to recent decades, when the pure white statuario grade more or less ran out. This was used by Michelangelo and other Renaissance sculptors, and later exported, including to America.

== Material origin and qualities ==
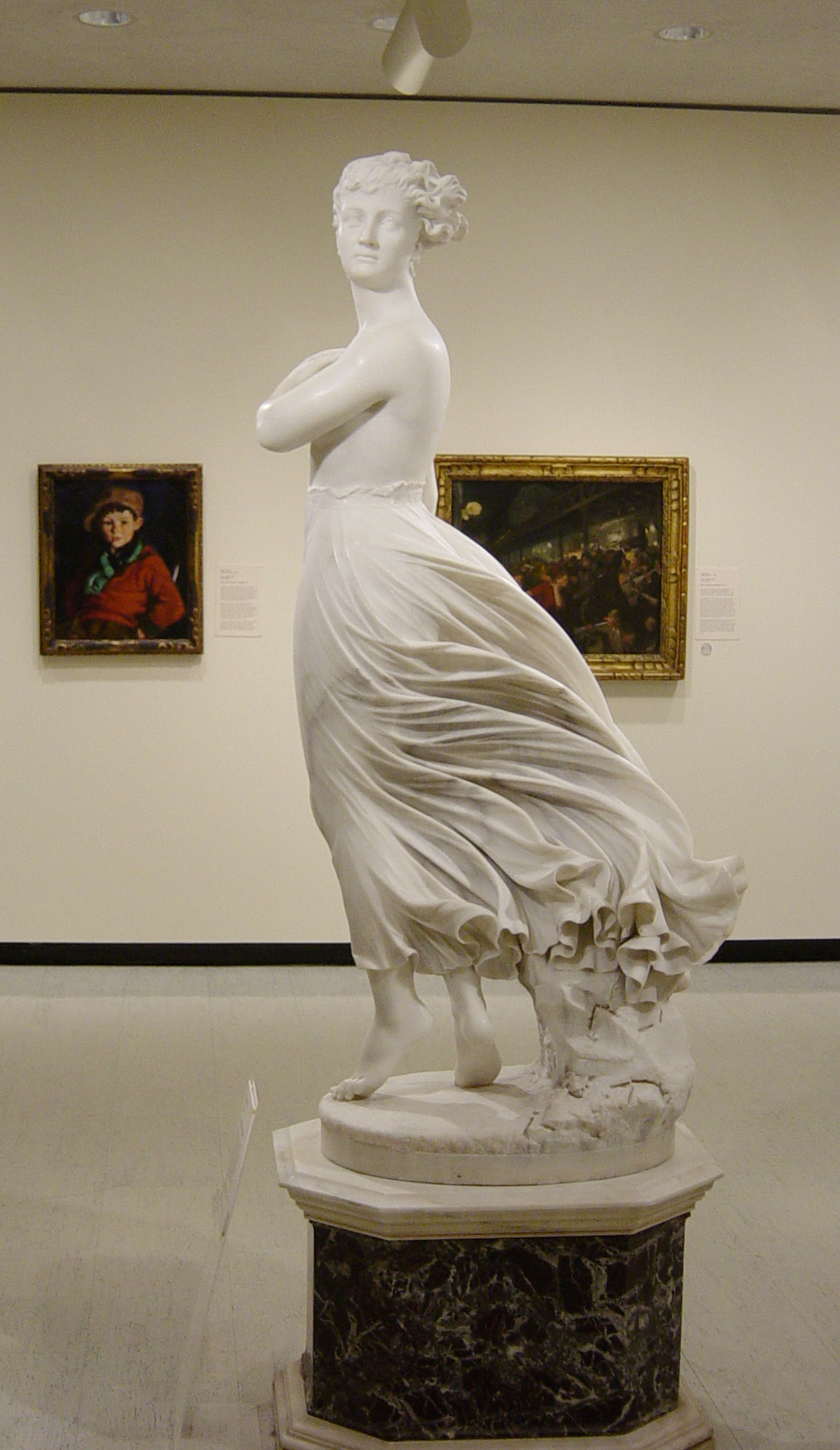
Thomas Ridgeway Gould. The West Wind. (profile) 1876.

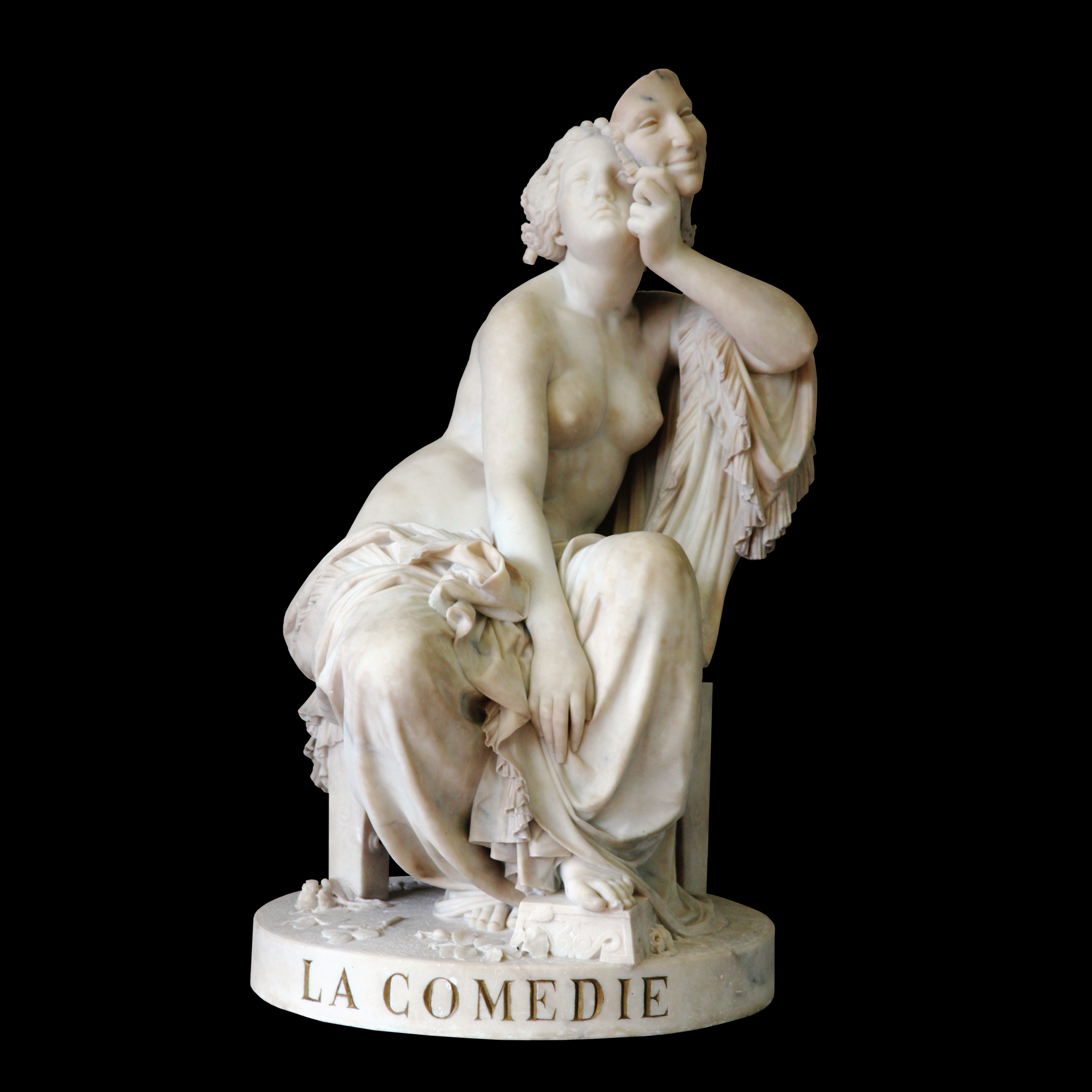
Comedy by Victor-Edmond Leharivel-Durocher

Marble is a metamorphic rock derived from limestone, composed mostly of calcite (a crystalline form of calcium carbonate, CaCO_{3}). The original source of the parent limestone is the seabed deposition of calcium carbonate in the form of microscopic animal skeletons or similar materials. Marble is formed when the limestone is transformed by heat and pressure after being overlain by other materials. The finest marbles for sculpture have no or few stains, though natural stains can be incorporated into the work itself.

=== Advantages ===
Among the commonly available stones, only marble has a slight translucency i.e. subsurface scattering that is comparable to that of human skin. It is this translucency that gives a marble sculpture a visual depth beyond its surface and this evokes a certain realism when used for figurative works. Some types of marble also have the advantage that, when first quarried, it is relatively soft and easy to work, refine, and polish. As the finished marble ages, it becomes harder and more durable. Preference to the cheaper and less translucent limestone is based largely on the fineness of marble's grain, which enables the sculptor to render minute detail in a manner not always possible with limestone. In contrast to limestone, marble is also extremely weather-resistant. As a result, surface changes due to the immediate environment are not always visible to the naked eye. This feature can pose challenges when dating ancient works.

=== Disadvantages ===
Marble sculptors must be careful when handling their materials, as the stone can absorb skin oils and develop yellow or brown stains. While more resistant than limestone it is subject to attack by weak acids, and so performs poorly in outdoor environments subject to acid rain. For severe environments, granite is a more lasting material but one which is far more difficult to work and much less suitable for refined works. Compared to metals such as bronze, furthermore, marble is inflexible and vulnerable to fracturing. This drawback means that sculptors must incorporate specific supporting features into the sculpture to prevent collapse. In Thomas Ridgeway Gould's The West Wind, for example, he poised the figure's short and slender ankles delicately upon the balls of her small feet. This would not be possible without the deliberate decision by Gould to distribute almost all of the marble's weight to her massive, flowing skirt. Unlike bronze sculpture, this statue is not hollow; her drapery is one solid block of marble.

== Developing a sculpture ==
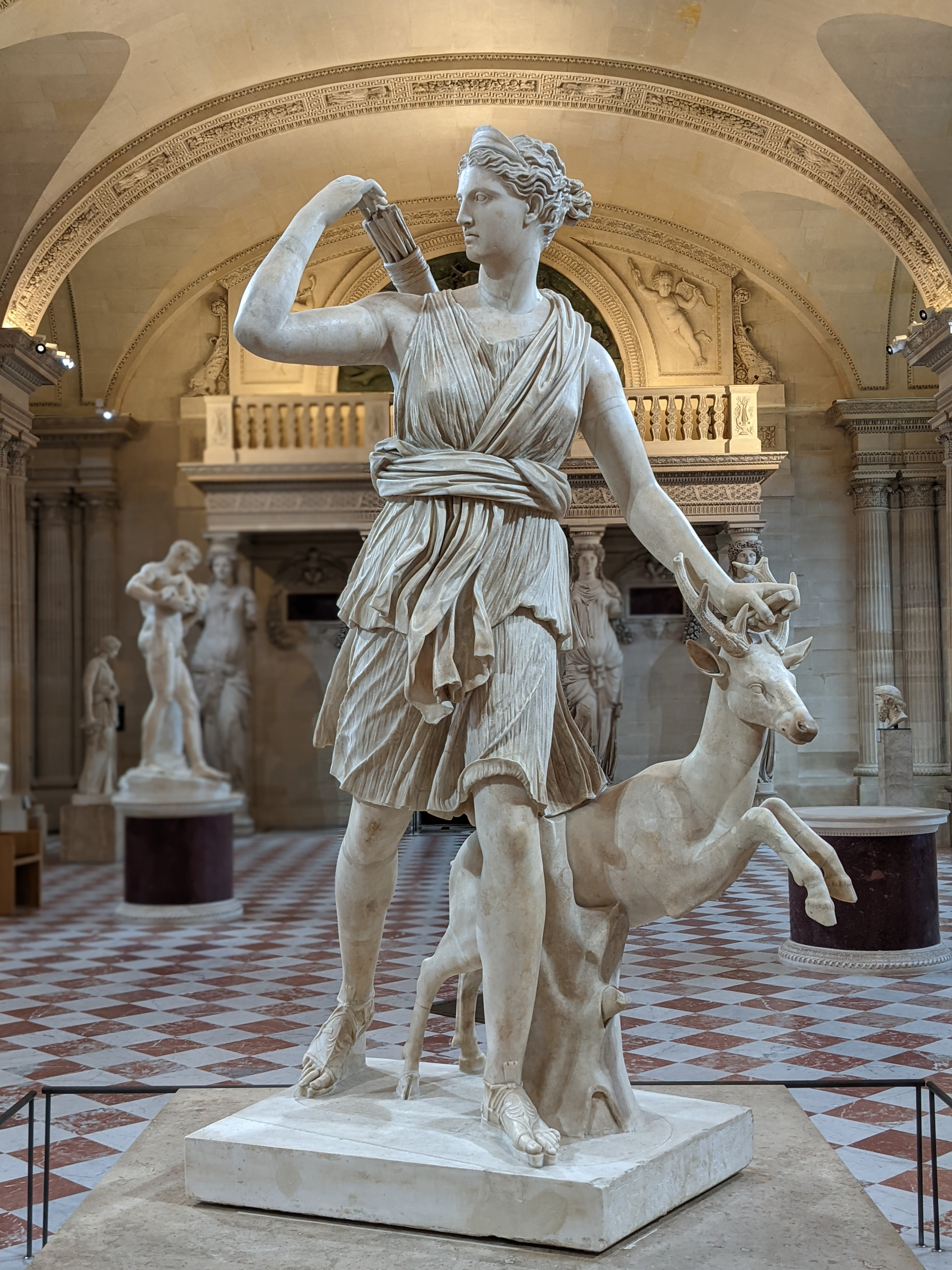
Diana of Versailles statue in the Louvre: note use of skirt, tree stump, and stag for support of the body and lower arm and the "pinning" of the upper arm to the arrows in the quiver, forming several closed loops that are thus stronger

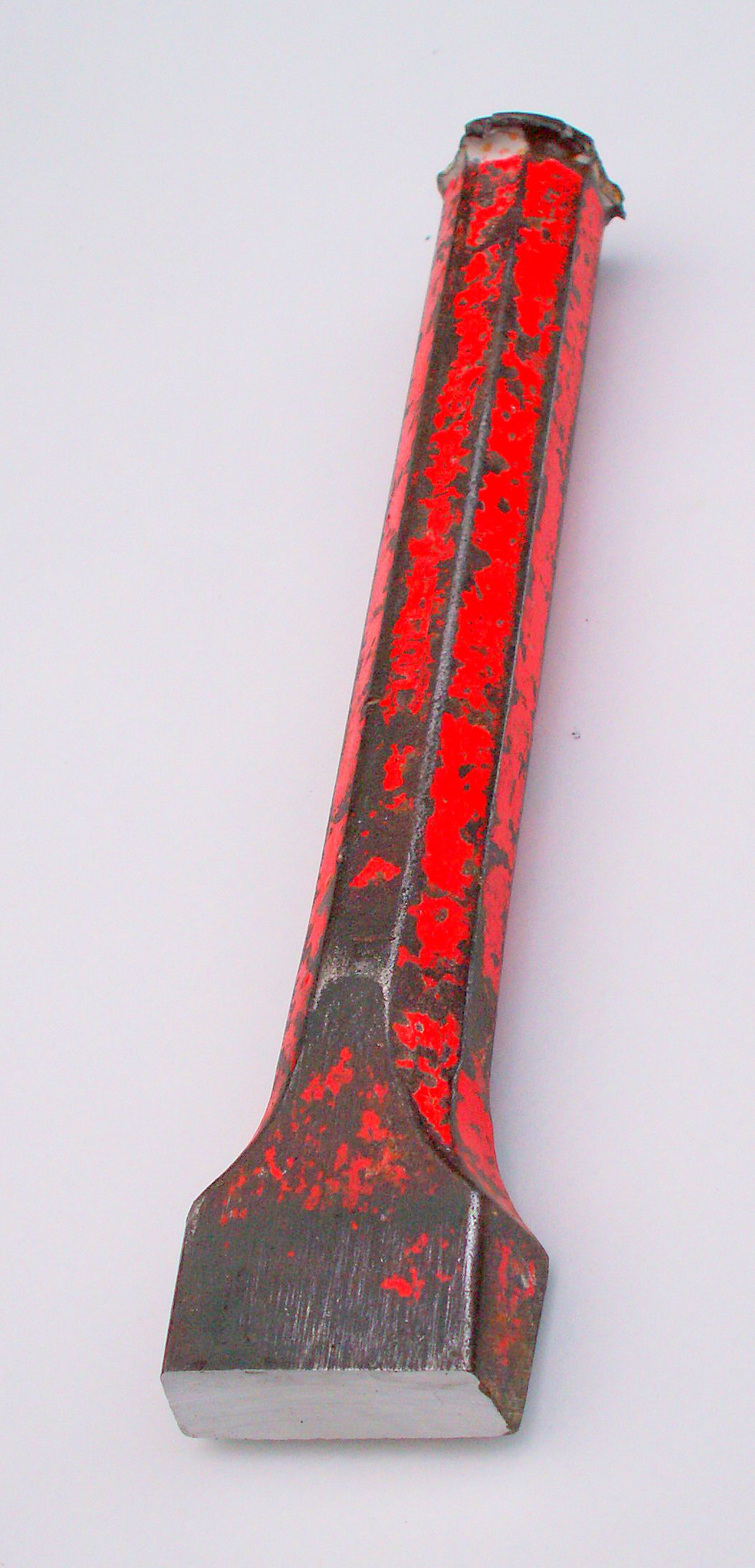
A pitching tool for carving stone

Sculptors usually begin by knocking off, or "pitching," large portions of unwanted stone. A suitable tool for this task is a point chisel, which is a long, hefty piece of steel with a point at one end and a broad striking surface at the other. A pitching tool may also be used at this early stage, which is a wedge-shaped chisel with a broad, flat edge. The pitching tool is useful for splitting the stone and removing large, unwanted chunks.

The sculptor may also use a mallet, which is similar to a hammer with a broad, barrel-shaped head. When the mallet connects to the tool, energy is transferred through the tool, shattering the stone. Most sculptors work rhythmically, turning the tool with each blow so that the stone is removed quickly and evenly. This is the "roughing out" stage of the sculpting process. While a mallet provides the force needed to fracture the marble, it must be used accurately. The smallest miscalculation can ruin the intended sculpture and even injure the sculptor.

Some artists prefer to carve directly onto the stone, without a model; the Renaissance artist Michelangelo, for example, claimed that his job was to free the human form trapped inside the block. Other artists sculpt a preliminary model out of clay or wax and then translate its features to stone through the use of calipers or a pointing machine.

Once the general shape of the statue has been determined, the sculptor uses other tools to refine the figure. A toothed chisel or claw chisel has multiple gouging surfaces which create parallel lines in the stone. These tools are generally used to add texture to the figure. An artist might mark out specific lines by using calipers to measure an area of stone to be addressed and marking the removal area with pencil, charcoal or chalk. The stone carver generally uses a shallower stroke at this point in the process.

Eventually, the sculptor has changed the stone from a rough block into the general shape of the finished statue. Tools called rasps and rifflers are then used to enhance the shape into its final form. A rasp is a flat, steel tool with a coarse surface. The sculptor uses broad, sweeping strokes to remove excess stone as small chips or dust. A riffler is a smaller variation of the rasp, which can be used to create details such as folds of clothing or locks of hair.

Polishing is the last step of the carving process. Sculptors use a variety of fine, abrasive materials such as sandpaper or emery paper to highlight patterns in the stone and to accentuate its natural sheen. Some sculptors may also use tin oxide to achieve a high-lustre polish. Regardless of the method, however, a glossy marble sculpture will appear more translucent than one that has not been polished.

== Tools ==
External videos
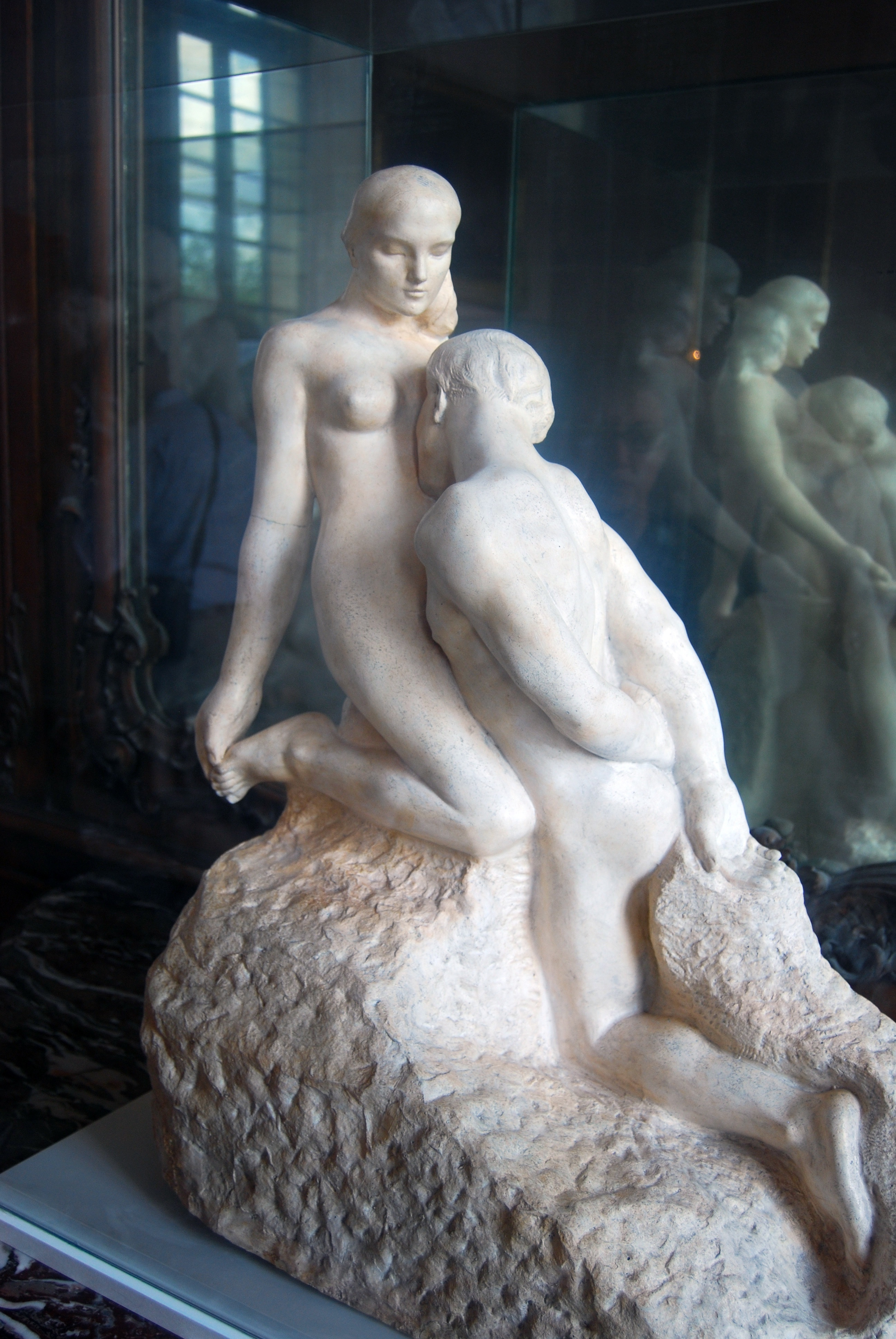
- Carving Marble with Traditional Tools, (2:47), J. Paul Getty Museum

The Italian terms for the basic carving tools of stone sculpture are given here, and where possible the English terms have been included.

- La Mazza – The mallet. This is used to strike the chisel.
- Gli Scalpelli – The chisels. These come in various types:
  - La Subbia – (the Point) a pointed chisel or punch
  - L'Unghietto – (Round or Rondel Chisel) Literally, "little fingernail"
  - La Gradina – (Toothed Chisel or Claw) a chisel with multiple teeth-
  - Lo Scalpello – a flat chisel
- Lo Scapezzatore – (Pitcher or Pitching Tool) a hefty chisel with a broad blunt edge, for splitting.
- Il Martello Pneumatico – Pneumatic hammer
- Il Flessibile – an angle grinder, fitted with an electrolysis-applied diamond studded blade
- Hand Drill

In addition to those hand tools listed above, the marble sculptor uses a variety of hammers – both for the striking of edge tools (chisels and hand drills) and for striking the stone directly (Bocciarda a Martello in Italian, Boucharde in French, Bush Hammer in English). Following the work of the hammer and chisel, the sculptor will sometimes refine the form further through the use of rasps, files and abrasive rubbing stones and/or sandpaper to smooth the surface contours of the form.

== Tool technique ==
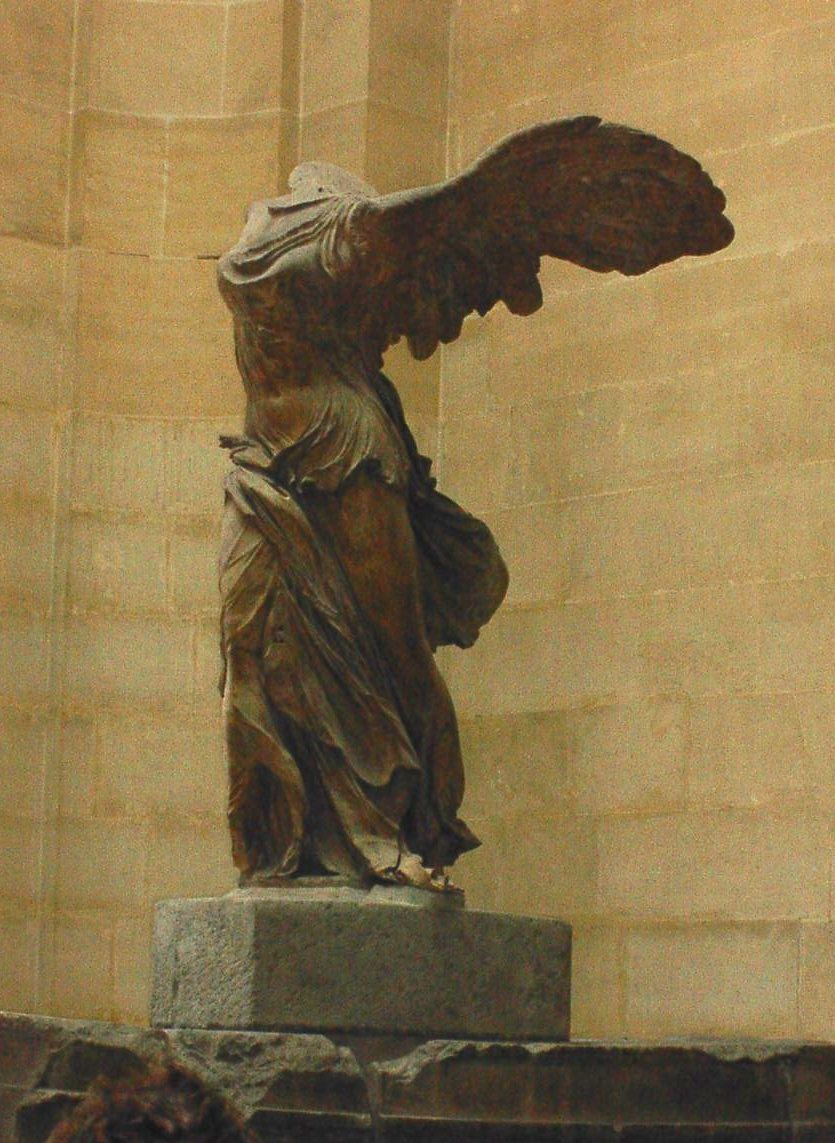
Winged Victory of Samothrace, Hellenistic marble sculpture of the 3rd century BC

Hammer and point work is the technique used in working stone, in use at least since Roman times, as it is described in the legend of Pygmalion, and even earlier, the ancient Greek sculptors used it from c. 650 BC. It consists of holding the pointed chisel against the stone and swinging the hammer at it as hard as possible. When the hammer connects with the striking end of the chisel, its energy is transferred down the length and concentrates on a single point on the surface of the block, breaking the stone. This is continued in a line following the desired contour. It may sound simple but many months are required to attain competency. A good stone worker can maintain a rhythm of relatively longer blows (about one per second), swinging the hammer in a wider arc, lifting the chisel between blows to flick out any chips that remain in the way, and repositioning it for the next blow. This way, one can drive the point deeper into the stone and remove more material at a time. Some stoneworkers also spin the subbia in their fingers between hammer blows, thus applying with each blow a different part of the point to the stone. This helps prevent the point from breaking.

== Automation and robotic carving techniques ==
Some contemporary sculptors use advanced robots and automation software to help them create carved works in marble. A 2021 New York Times article describes how robots like ABB2, a 13-foot zinc-alloy robotic arm located in Carrara, Italy, mill marble slabs to fit designs created by artists from the United States, Great Britain, and elsewhere.

Artists often blend robotic carving with hand carving. The process begins with digital files artists create to guide their robotic carving systems. “The data drives computer-controlled, stone-carving machines that use diamond and carbide bits that slowly mill away a rough version of the sculpture,” described New York sculptor Barry X Ball in a 2020 interview. “Then, we take it from there.” Ball's sculpture Sleeping Hermaphrodite required 10,000 hours of hand-sculpting after the initial robot sculpting phase was completed.

While some artists and scholars criticize the use of robot technology in marble sculpture, others see it as a natural evolution of the classical tradition. In a 2021 article, art historian Marco Ciampolini stated that many of history's greatest artists, including Michelangelo, delegated work to apprentices, and that the only difference between that practice and the use of digital automation is the fact that modern-day helpers are robots, rather than humans.

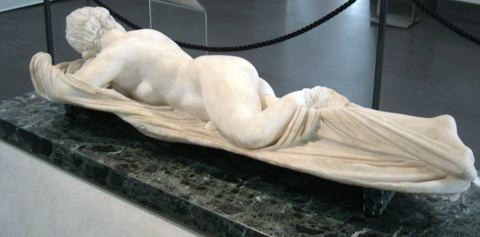
The 1st-century BC sculpture 'The Reclining Hermaphroditus', in the Museo Nazionale Romano, Palazzo Massimo Alle Terme in Rome

== See also ==
- Polychrome
- Stone sculpture
