= Greenway (surname) =

Greenway is a surname. Notable people with the surname include:

== For members of the Lauder Greenway family ==
- John Campbell Greenway (1872–1926), General, U.S. Army and Mining Magnate
- Isabella Greenway (1886–1953), U.S. Congresswoman
- G. Lauder Greenway (1904–1981), Chairman, Metropolitan Opera Association
- James Greenway (1903–1989), American ornithologist and Curator of the Museum of Comparative Zoology at Harvard
- H.D.S. Greenway, (b. 1935), American war correspondent, newspaper editor

== Others ==
- Barney Greenway (born 1969), British death metal vocalist
- Brian Greenway (born 1951), Canadian guitarist and vocalist
- Chad Greenway (born 1983), American football player
- Charles Greenway, 1st Baron Greenway (1857–1934), British businessman
- Diana Greenway (born 1937), British historian and academic
- Francis Greenway (1777–1837), Australian architect
- Harry Greenway (born 1934), British politician
- John Greenway (folklorist) (1919-1991)
- John Greenway (MP) (born 1946), British Conservative politician
- Jordan Greenway (born 1997), American ice hockey player
- Thomas Greenway (1838–1908), Premier of Manitoba, Canada
- Thomas John Greenway, mining metallurgist in Australia
- Tom Greenway (judoka), Canadian judoka
