= George Lauder (industrialist) =

Scottish industrialist

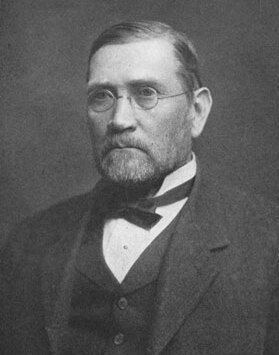
- Born: November 11, 1837; Dunfermline, Fife, Scotland
- Died: August 24, 1924 (aged 86); Greenwich, Connecticut, U.S.
- Resting place: Putnam Cemetery
- Other name: Dod
- Education: University of Glasgow
- Occupations: Industrialist; Mechanical Engineer
- Known for: Revolutionizing the steel industry as a partner at Carnegie Steel
- Spouse: Anna Maria Romeyn Varick
- Children: 3
- Parents: George Lauder (father); Seaton Morrison (mother)
- Family: Lauder-Greenway family

George Lauder Jr. (November 11, 1837 – August 24, 1924) was a Scottish-American industrialist. A trained mechanical engineer, Lauder was responsible for many of the technical advancements made in the steel industry during the Industrial Revolution including updates to both the Bessemer Process and coal washing machinery while also leading the use of steel in arms and defense.

Lauder was the first cousin and so-called "cousin-brother" of steel magnate Andrew Carnegie and his partner in the Carnegie Steel Company. He received proceeds from the sale in secure 5% gold mortgage bonds at 1.5 par value. Lauders fortune was later valued around $50 million (almost $2 Billion today).The sale of Carnegie Steel to J.P. Morgan in 1901 created U.S. Steel where Lauder sat on the board of directors.

== Early years ==
George Lauder was the son of George Lauder and Seaton Morrison. His father owned the general store on the local high street in Dunfermline. George was better known in Scotland for his commitment to Scottish nationalism, an egalitarian democracy, and the Chartism cause. He was a keen radical for the time, championing the preservation of human and public rights which led to the Reform Acts of 1836. After his wife Seaton died young, Lauder became instrumental in the upbringing of his only son George and his nephew Andrew Carnegie.

Lauder Jr. and Carnegie were two years apart in age and best friends as a result of their shared experiences. They affectionately referred to one another as "Dod" and "Naig" (respectively), due to their mutual inability to fully say each other's names as young children. After Andrew and his family left for America, George stayed in Scotland where he would go on to graduate from Glasgow University with a degree in mechanical engineering while studying under Lord Kelvin.

== Business life ==
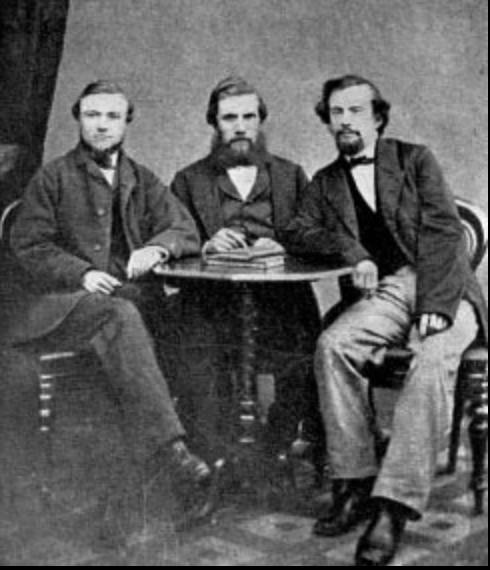
Andrew Carnegie, George Lauder, and Thomas Miller in 1862. Taken in Glasgow, Scotland.

In 1873, Carnegie wrote to Lauder, who, despite still living in Scotland had never ceased to be his closest confidant and advisor. Carnegie inquired about a term used in a contract for the steel to be used for the new Eads Bridge in St. Louis, Missouri. The term unknown to Carnegie was 'the modulus of elasticity' of Elastic modulus. Lauder, an academic, answered swiftly helping Carnegie close the contract. This provoked Carnegie to ask Lauder to join him in America in a precursor to Carnegie Brothers and Company. Lauder accepted and joined Carnegie, Carnegie's brother (and also Lauder's cousin) Thomas M. Carnegie and Henry Phipps, Jr. in Pittsburgh. He was initially charged with managing the company's coke works. He would later become the second largest stockholder of the Carnegie partnership.

Lauder brought a new dynamic to the business with his formal education, and expertise in, mechanical engineering. Surprisingly, none of the existing partners had any technical training or education. Furthermore, none had a university diploma at all—they learned the business as they went. Lauder brought several new developments to the steel industry in America. Initially, his most significant contribution was the introduction of the process for washing and coking dross from coal mines. At that point, steel mills simply threw the dross away. Lauder oversaw the design and construction of the first coal-washing machinery in the United States and would become industry-standard world-wide in the production of steel. Lauder would also go on to lead the development of the use of steel in armor and armaments which had been a business Carnegie balked at entering until President Benjamin Harrison personally appealed to him. Lauder and Charles M. Schwab would spend significant time at the Krupp factory in Germany in 1886 before returning to build the massive armor plate mill at the Homestead Steel Works that would revolutionize warfare forever.

By the turn of the twentieth century, Lauder was a director of Carnegie Steel, ran both the coke and ore businesses, and was the company's second largest shareholder after Carnegie. After over thirty years as a senior member of the syndicate, Lauder was seen as the "balance wheel" for his moderate and cautious counsel and the lone "brake" for his often impulsive cousin Carnegie. Partner Daniel Clemson referred to Lauder as a "father figure" to the rest of the company.

After the successful sale of Carnegie Steel Company to J.P. Morgan which lead to the formation of U.S. Steel in 1901, Lauder joined the board of directors of the new company. It became the first corporation in the world with a market capitalization exceeding US$1 billion.

=== Inventor ===
Throughout the course of his career, Lauder created a number of patented scientific advancements useful both in the steel industry and beyond. His first known patent was approved in 1875 for Improvements in Joints for Wrought-Iron Pipes which he assigned to himself and his cousin and partner Thomas Carnegie. By 1877 his contributions started become more technical including advancements in Galvanic batteries and significant advancement in Folding Machines for newspaper and book publishing.

Based on the timeline of patents, it appears that Lauder did not focus original technical thinking for the steel industry until the 1880s. For it was in this decade that Lauder patented his two of his most significant contributions to the steel industry. In 1885 he received a patent for what was misleading titled Bessemer Process. While Henry Bessemer created the process in 1856, Lauder's patent in 1885 was the lynch-pin and refinement that created almost universal uniformity in the steel output. Until then, there were too many steps, thus allowing for human error. In addition, Lauder removed the decarburizing step entirely and was able to remove the silicon with the final "blow" on the metal during the process. In 1887, Lauder improved on his coal washing process with a new machine simply called the "Coal and Ore Jigger". This machine maximized the now extremely significant revenue source of materials that were previously considered waste of the steel production process.

== Marriage and issue ==
George Lauder married Anna Maria Romeyn Varick in 1877. His wife, a member of old Dutch New York Society, was a descendant from many key figures in the creation and development of New York City. Her ancestors include Joris Jansen Rapelje who was among the earliest settlers of New Netherland in 1623 and a member of the Council of Twelve Men—the first democratic institution in the future United States. She was also a descendant of Richard Varick, the second post-colonial (and 45th overall) Mayor of New York City. George and Anna Maria had three children together, Harriet, George III. and Elizabeth.

Their daughter Harriet married Dr. James C. Greenway combining the Lauder and Greenway families into what is now known as the Lauder-Greenway family. Together, they gifted the endowment that created the Yale School of Public Health. They also purchased what would become the Lauder Greenway Estate in Greenwich. Lauder's son (Harriet's brother), George Lauder III, was a high-profile sailor who set the record in 1900 (held until 1905) for the fastest trans-Atlantic crossing with his yacht, Endymion.

Lauders' descendants include ornithologist and explorer James Cowan Greenway; G. Lauder Greenway, who led the Metropolitan Opera Association; Polly Lauder Tunney, who would marry reigning world heavyweight boxing champion Gene Tunney; U.S. Representative and U.S. Senator John V. Tunney; war correspondent H.D.S. Greenway; long-time CIA operative George V. Lauder Sr.; and renowned ichthyologist George V. Lauder.

== Family Estate ==
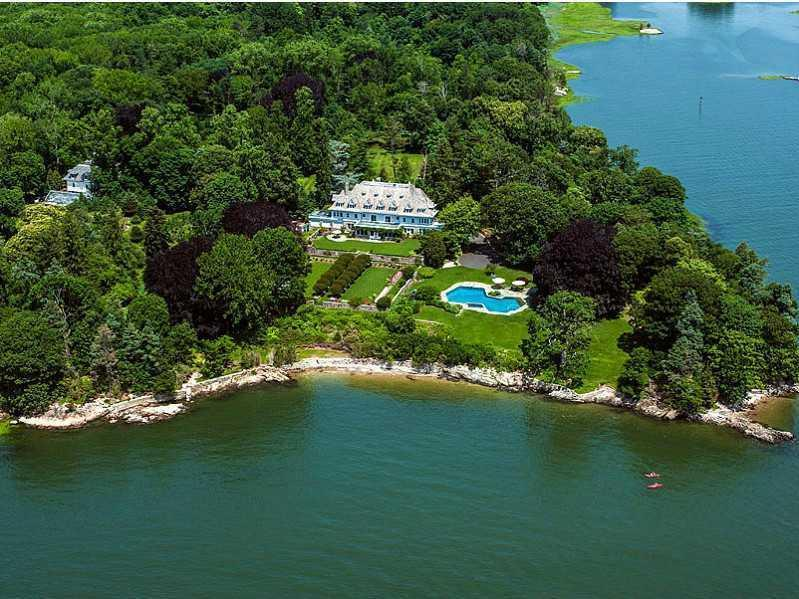
Aerial view of the estate

George Lauder lived out the last eleven years of his life as a widower at the Lauder Greenway Estate in Greenwich, Connecticut. Built for industrialist John Hamilton Gourlie in 1896, it was purchased by Lauder's daughter Harriet in 1905. At the time of purchase, the estate included 57 acres and included fruit-bearing orchards, a chicken and pig farm, as well as the French Renaissance mansion, to which the family added two wings in the early 1910s and expanded the estate to over 100 acres.

Still considered to be "...Greenwich, Conn.’s last Great Estate, an opulent robber baron-era property enveloping 50 prized acres along the tony New York suburb’s waterfront." It is the largest surviving Gilded Age mansion in Connecticut. It became the most expensive private residence in the United States in 2014 when it sold for $120 million ($163.2 million today).

== See also ==
- History of the steel industry (1850–1970)
- Carnegie College
- Homestead Steel Works
- Andrew Mellon
- Steel production
- Steel industry
