= Greenway =

Greenway or Greenways may refer to:

- Greenway (landscape), a linear park focused on a trail or bike path
- Another term for bicycle boulevards in some jurisdictions

== Art, entertainment, and media ==
- Green Ways (John Ireland) (or Greenways), 1937 piano pieces

== People ==
- Greenway (surname)

== Places ==
=== Australia ===
- Electoral division of Greenway in New South Wales, Australia
- Greenway, Australian Capital Territory
- GreenWay, a cycling and walking trail in Sydney
- Greenways, South Australia, a town

=== Canada ===
- Greenway, Manitoba
- Greenway Sound and Greenway Point, British Columbia
- Greenway, Ontario

=== Ireland ===
- Boyne Greenway, cycle and walkway, Co. Meath
- Dublin-Galway Greenway, cycle and walkway
- Great Western Greenway, cycle and walkway, Co. Mayo
- Waterford Greenway, cycle and walkway between Waterford and Dungarvan

=== United Kingdom ===
- Greenway, several places in England
- Greenway footpath, London
- Greenway Estate, Devon, former house of Agatha Christie
- Greenway Halt railway station (Devon)

=== United States ===
- Greenway (Washington, D.C.), a neighborhood
- Central Florida GreeneWay, roadway around Orlando, Florida
- Dulles Greenway, tollway in Virginia
- East Coast Greenway project, linking Atlantic coast cities
- Greater Grand Forks Greenway, park
- Greenway, Arkansas, small town
- Greenway, South Dakota, unincorporated community in McPherson County
- Greenway (Madison Mills, Virginia), a historic house and farm
- Greenway Court, Virginia, National Historic Landmark, Virginia
- Greenway Plantation, Virginia
- Greenway Township, Minnesota, small town
- Manhattan Waterfront Greenway
- Maryville Alcoa Greenway, foot and cycle path in Tennessee
- Midtown Greenway, Minneapolis, Minnesota
- Mountains to Sound Greenway, Washington
- Niagara River Greenway Plan
- Rachel Carson Greenway, Montgomery County, Maryland
- Rose Fitzgerald Kennedy Greenway, linear park in Boston

== Other uses ==
- East Lancs Greenway, British single-deck bus
- Greenways F.C., an English football club
- Greenways School, a former English preparatory school
- European Greenways Association, an association for sustainable transport

== See also ==
- Greenaway (disambiguation)
- Greenways Road, Chennai, Tamil Nadu, India
  - Greenways Road railway station
