= Statue of Barry Goldwater =

Statue in the U.S. Capitol

Barry Goldwater
- The statue at the National Statuary Hall, 2023
- Artist: Deborah Copenhaver Fellows
- Year: 2015
- Medium: Bronze sculpture
- Subject: Barry Goldwater
- Location: Washington, D.C., United States

Barry Goldwater is a bronze sculpture depicting American politician and businessman of the same name by Deborah Copenhaver Fellows, installed at the United States Capitol's National Statuary Hall, in Washington, D.C., as part of the National Statuary Hall Collection. The statue was donated by the U.S. state of Arizona in 2015 and replaced a statue of John Campbell Greenway, which the state of Arizona gifted to the collection in 1930.

The statue was installed on March 28, 2014, and unveiled March 31 at the Arizona Capitol. It remained there until being moved to Washington, D.C., for its unveiling in the National Statuary Hall Collection.

== See also ==
- 2015 in art
