= Greenaway =

Greenaway is a surname. Notable people with the surname include:

- David Greenaway (footballer) (1889–1946), Scottish footballer
- David Greenaway (economist) (born 1952), professor of economics at the University of Nottingham
- Emerson Greenaway (1906-1990), American librarian
- Frank Greenaway (1917–2013), English chemist and writer
- Gavin Greenaway (born 1964), music composer and conductor, son of Roger Greenaway
- Joseph A. Greenaway, Jr. (born 1957), United States judge
- Kate Greenaway (1846–1901), children's book illustrator and writer
- Lorne Greenaway (1933-2010), Progressive Conservative party member of the Canadian House of Commons
- Peter Greenaway (born 1942), Welsh-born English film director
- Peter Van Greenaway (1929–1988), British novelist
- Roger Greenaway (born 1938), popular English songwriter
- Sally Greenaway (born 1984), Australian composer and pianist

== Fictional ==
- Elle Greenaway, a former protagonist of American television crime drama series Criminal Minds

== See also ==
- Greenway (disambiguation)
- The Greenaway baronets, a title in the Baronetage of the United Kingdom
- The Kate Greenaway Medal, a prize to an outstanding work of illustration in children's literature
