= David Greenaway =

David Greenaway may refer to:

- David Greenaway (footballer)
- David Greenaway (economist)
