= Lauder-Greenway family =

Scottish-American family

Lauder-Greenway
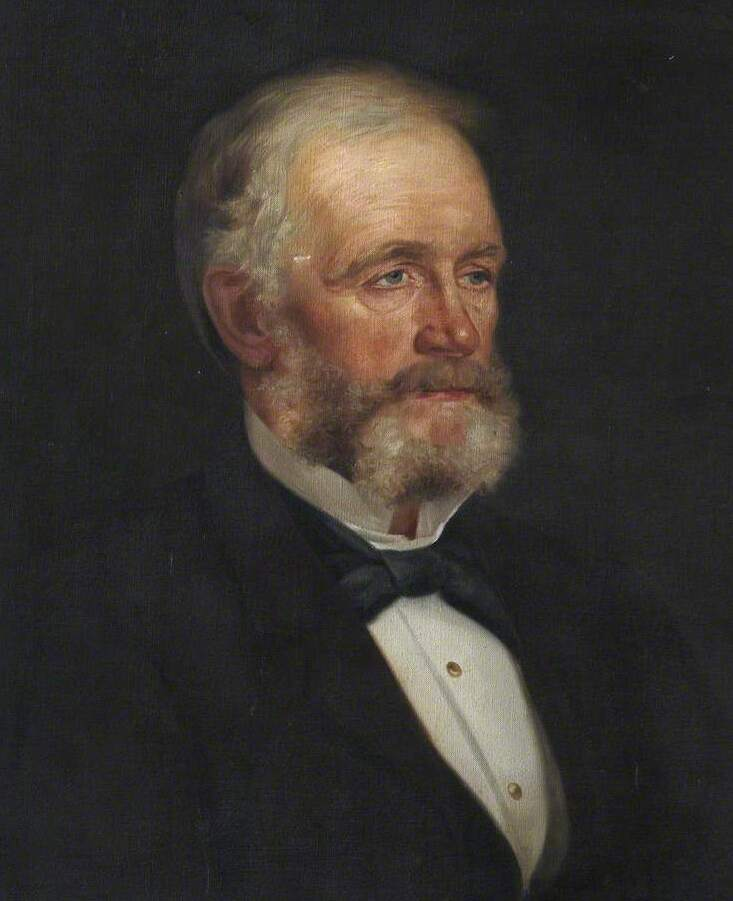
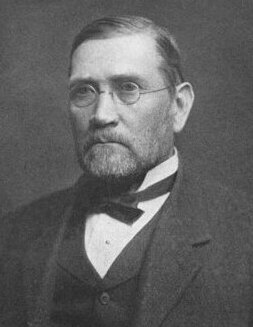
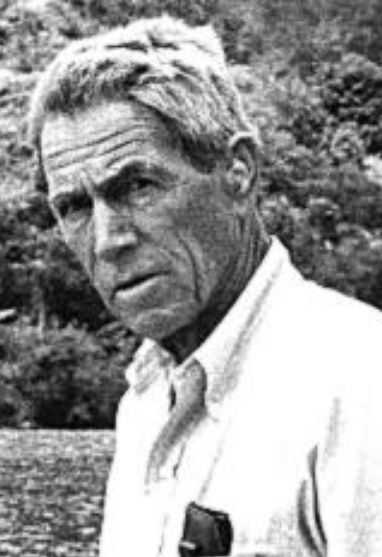
- George; Lauder Sr. George Lauder Jr. James C. Greenway
- Current region: New York City; Greenwich, Connecticut; Washington, D.C.
- Origin: Scotland
- Members: George Lauder Sr. George Lauder; John Greenway; James Greenway; G. Lauder Greenway; Polly Lauder Tunney; George V. Lauder Sr. John V. Tunney; H.D.S. Greenway; George V. Lauder
- Connected families: Carnegie Family
- Estate: Lauder Greenway Estate

The Lauder-Greenway family is a Scottish-American family whose influence on, and involvement in, American political and economic affairs dates from the 1640s through the contemporary era. Their primary contributions have been in the sciences, government, and intelligence. The most notable members are George Lauder and his "cousin-brother" Andrew Carnegie. They co-created the Carnegie Steel Corporation, the forerunner to U.S. Steel, and subsequently became two of the richest men in the world.

== History ==
George Lauder Sr. was a 19th-century Scottish businessman and political radical in Dunfermline who raised and educated George Lauder and Andrew Carnegie. After the two younger men moved to the United States, Lauder married Anna Maria Romeyn Varick, a patrician Old Dutch New Yorker. She was a direct descendant of many prominent New Yorkers of history including Joris Jansen Rapelje a founder of the colony of New Amsterdam in 1624 who was a member of the Council of Twelve Men, the first democratic body in the history of the United States (1641). Also, Colonel Richard Varick, the private secretary to George Washington and the first mayor of New York City after independence from 1789 to 1800.

George and Anna Lauder had three children, including George Lauder III, Elizabeth Storm Lauder, and Harriet Lauder. Harriet married Dr. James C. Greenway in 1903 connecting the two families. Dr. Greenway was descended from several prominent generations of Americans since the Revolutionary War including two signers of the Fincastle Resolutions (General Evan Shelby and General William Campbell) and Governor Issac Shelby, the first Governor of the state of Kentucky. His great-grandfather was Dr. Ephraim McDowell the pioneer surgeon who was the first person to successfully remove an ovarian tumor. He has been called "the father of ovariotomy" as well as founding father of abdominal surgery.

== Business activities ==
=== Engineering ===
The Lauder-Greenway family made an enormous impact on the Industrial Revolution in their contributions to metals, mining, and mechanical engineering industries which is the source of their modern wealth. George Lauder was a mechanical engineer who studied under Lord Kelvin and lead the scientific arm of the Carnegie Steel Corporation. He was the second largest shareholder of the company, behind Andrew Carnegie when they sold Carnegie Steel to J.P. Morgan and created U.S. Steel which Lauder sat on the board of. This was the first corporation in the world with a market capitalization exceeding US$1 billion ($54.2 billion today).

John Campbell Greenway, a former Rough Rider with Theodore Roosevelt, was a mechanical engineer like Lauder who helped revolutionize the iron ore and copper mining industries in America at the turn of the century. He developed the first large-scale iron ore benefication plants in the world and would later build large copper mining concerns in Arizona including the New Cornelia mine which became the first large open pit mine in Arizona. Greenways Calumet and Arizona Mining Company would then be purchased by the Phelps Dodge Corporation consolidating almost total control of copper mining in the United States.

=== 20th century ===
Post-industrial, and as a combined entity, the Lauder-Greenway family continued their focuses on the sciences largely at the Museum of Comparative Zoology at Harvard University where both James Greenway was, and George V. Lauder currently is, the curator.

Lateral to the above, several members have worked for intelligence agencies for the United States including James Greenway, John Cambell Greenway, and G. Lauder Greenway for the Office of Naval Intelligence while Gilbert Greenway and George V. Lauder Sr. worked for the Central Intelligence Agency. Senator John Varick Tunney was chairman of the Senate Judiciary Subcommittee on Constitutional Rights doing much of the early work on surveillance rights related to domestic intelligence while his cousins were at the CIA. He also sat on the United States Congress Joint Committee on Atomic Energy.

== Philanthropic activities ==
Major, long-term support from the family has been directed primarily to Yale University where the Lauder-Greenways endowed the Yale School of Public Health, built Lauder Hall on the campus, and have endowed numerous scholarship programs. Significant support led by G. Lauder Greenway and Polly Lauder Tunney has also been directed towards the Metropolitan Opera Association and the creation of Lincoln Center, where G. Lauder Greenway was the chairman for many years. Phillips Andover, the New York Philharmonic, and the New York University Institute of Fine Arts have also received significant support.

== Residence ==
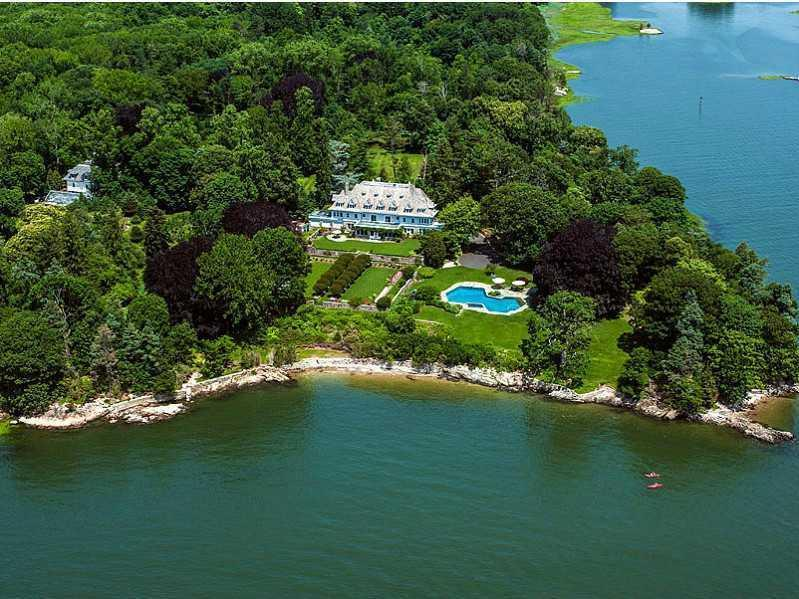
Aerial view of the estate

The Lauder Greenway Estate is a 50-acre private property with a French Renaissance mansion in Greenwich, Connecticut built in 1896. When it was sold in 2013 for $120,000,000 it was the most expensive home in American history.

Purchased by Harriet Lauder Greenway and Dr. James C. Greenway after they were married in 1903, they would greatly expand the house and outbuildings after the purchase. At its peak, the estate was over 100 acres. Then the family began donating large parcels of land for various causes. In 1918, James and Harriet gifted one of the islands to the town of Greenwich; the property, located about two miles south of Greenwich Harbor, now serves as the popular Island Beach. The couple donated the first ferry providing transportation to the beach for town residents two years later. Considered "...Greenwich, Conn.'s last Great Estate, an opulent robber baron-era property enveloping 50 prized acres along the tony New York suburb's waterfront." It is the largest surviving Gilded Age mansion in Connecticut.

== Members ==
- George Lauder Sr. (1815–1901), Leader of Chartism in Scottish politics
- George Lauder (1837–1924), billionaire industrialist, Mechanical engineer, partner in Carnegie Steel Corporation, director of U.S. Steel
- John Campbell Greenway (1872–1926), General, U.S. Army, a Rough Rider with Theodore Roosevelt, intelligence officer with the Office of Naval Intelligence, Mining Magnate
- Harriet Lauder Greenway and James Greenway Sr. (married 1903), whose marriage linked the Lauder and Greenway Families together and purchased the Lauder Greenway Estate. They also gifted the endowment that created the Yale School of Public Health
- George Lauder Jr. (1878–1916), philanthropist and yachtsman whose schooner, the Endymion, held the record for fastest transatlantic crossing.
- James Greenway (1903–1989), Curator, Museum of Comparative Zoology at Harvard University, renowned Ornithologist, Lt. Commander U.S. Navy, Intelligence Officer with the Office of Naval Intelligence
- G. Lauder Greenway (1904–1981), chairman, Metropolitan Opera Association, and Director, New York Philharmonic. Intelligence officer with the Office of Naval Intelligence. Long time companion of Ailsa Mellon Bruce
- Polly Lauder Tunney (1907–2008), Philanthropist, wife of World Heavyweight Champion Gene Tunney
- George V. Lauder Sr. (1924–2012), Chief of Latin American Division for the CIA, Director of Public Affairs for the CIA, Deputy Inspector General of the CIA.
- John V. Tunney (1934–2018), U.S. Congressman then U.S. Senator from California. Basis of the film The Candidate starring Robert Redford.
- H.D.S. Greenway (b. 1935), war correspondent for Time Life, the Washington Post, and the Boston Globe for Vietnam War; the Killing Fields; Lebanese Civil War; Yugoslav Wars; etc. Member of the Council on Foreign Relations.
- George V. Lauder (b. 1955), Curator, Museum of Comparative Zoology at Harvard University, renowned Ichthyologist.

=== Ancestors ===
- Joris Jansen Rapelje (1604–1662/63), a member of the Council of Twelve Men, the first democratic body in the history of the United States (1641)
- General Evan Shelby (1720–1794), Brigadier General in the Continental Army, Signer of the Fincastle Resolutions
- Colonel Samuel McDowell (1735–1817), Colonel in the Continental Army, and Federal Judge
- General William Campbell (1745–1781), Brigadier General in the Continental Army, Signer of the Fincastle Resolutions
- Governor Issac Shelby (1750–1826), Revolutionary War hero, and first Governor of the state of Kentucky
- Colonel Richard Varick (1753–1831), private secretary to George Washington and the first elected mayor of New York City after independence (1789–1800)
- Dr. Ephraim McDowell (1771–1830), An American physician and pioneer surgeon. The first person to successfully remove an ovarian tumor, he has been called "the father of ovariotomy" as well as founding father of abdominal surgery.

== See also ==
- Rockefeller Family
- History of New York City
- Gilded Age
- Vanderbilt Family
