= Statue of John Campbell Greenway =

Statue by Gutzon Borglum

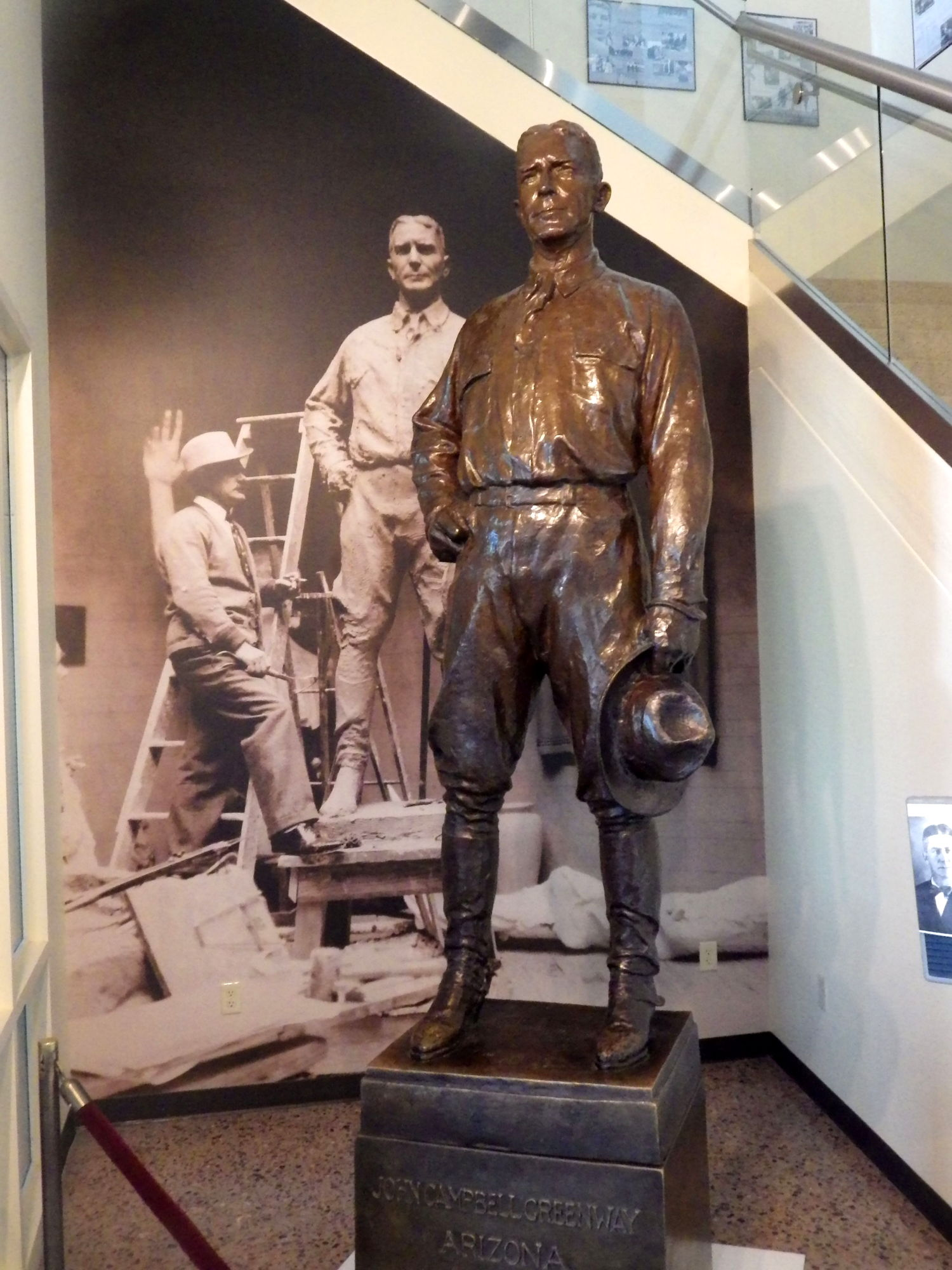
- Phoenix version
- Artist: Gutzon Borglum
- Subject: John Campbell Greenway

John Campbell Greenway is a 1930 bronze statue of John Campbell Greenway by Gutzon Borglum, one version of which was installed in the United States Capitol, in Washington D.C., as part of the National Statuary Hall Collection. It was one of two statues donated by the state of Arizona. The sculpture was unveiled by Senator Henry Ashurst of Arizona on May 24, 1930.

== National Statuary Hall Collection and Phoenix ==
The Greenway statue was replaced in the Statuary Hall Collection by a statue of Barry Goldwater by Deborah Copenhaver Fellows in 2015. The Greenway statue was relocated in the Polly Rosenbaum Archives and History Building in Phoenix, where it presides over the entrance lobby in a niche designed for the work. On the wall behind the statue is a large photograph of Borglum working on the almost completed statue.

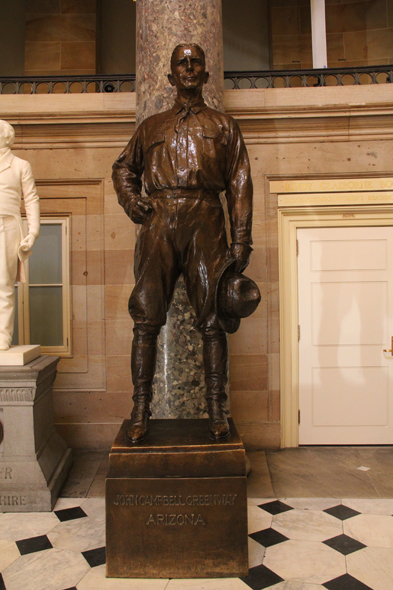
The statue in 2014, before it was removed from the National Statuary Hall

== Tucson ==
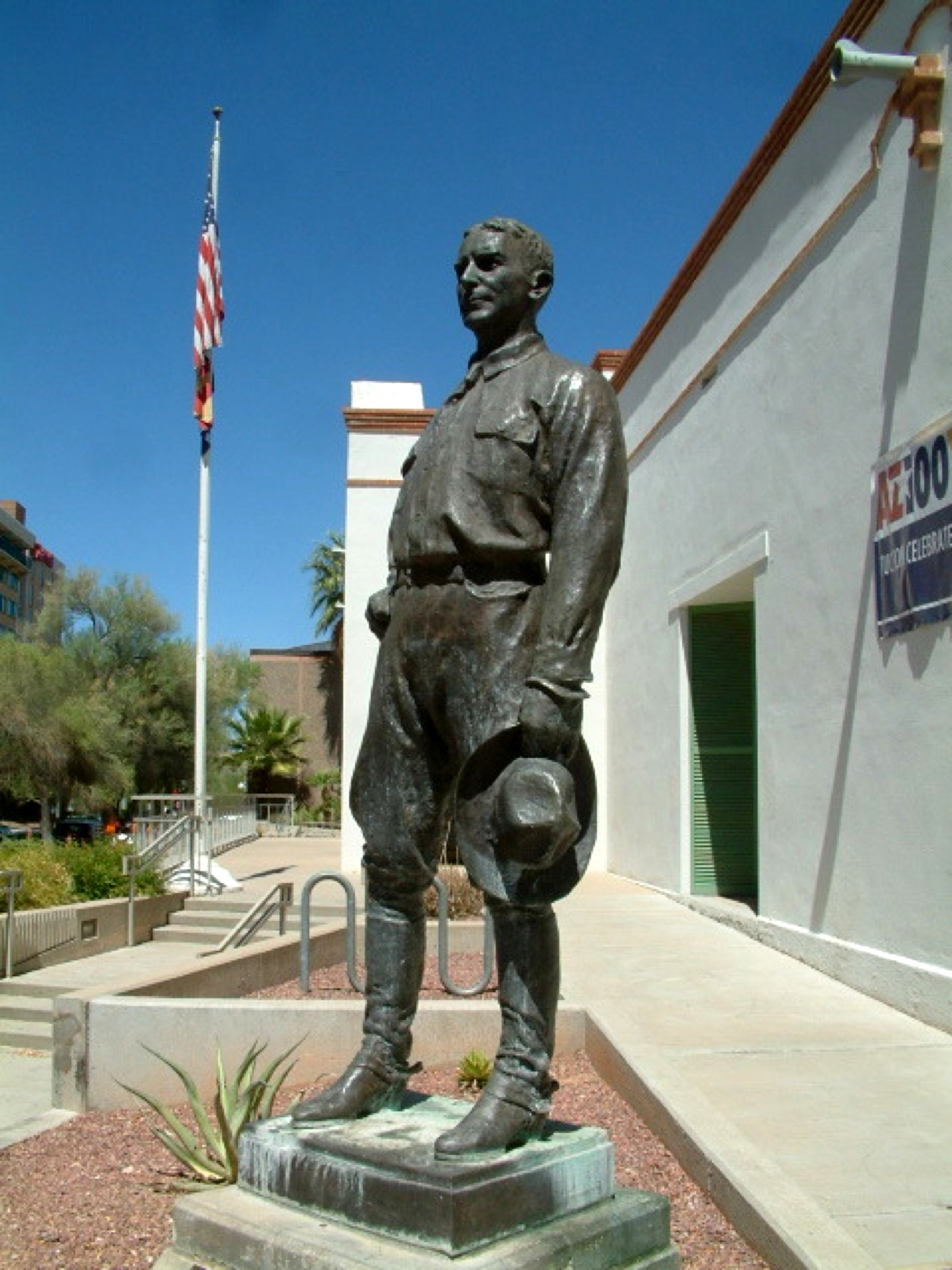
Statue in Tucson, Arizona

A second casting of the statue, located in front of the Arizona Historical Society building in Tucson, Arizona, was dedicated on April 11, 1975.

== See also ==
- 1930 in art
