= Endymion (yacht) =

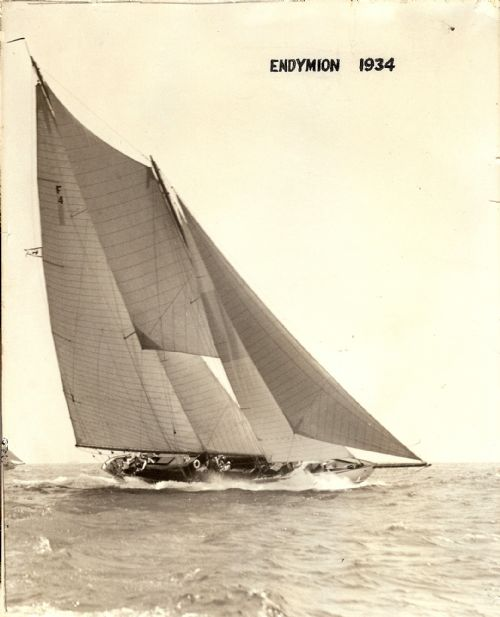
- Endymion at sea in 1934
- Yacht club: Indian Harbor Yacht Club
- Nation: United States
- Designer(s): C.H. Crane of Tam, Lemoine, and Crane of New York City
- Builder: George Lawley & Son
- Owner(s): George Lauder III
- Fate: Unknown

Specifications
- Type: Schooner
- Displacement: 144 tons
- Length: 137 ft (42 m) (LOA); 111.6 ft (34.0 m) (LWL)
- Beam: 24.4 ft (7.4 m)
- Draft: 14 ft (4.3 m)
- Crew: 12

Endymion was an American schooner owned by George Lauder III, son of billionaire George Lauder. Lauder III was Commodore of the Indian Harbor Yacht Club in Greenwich, Connecticut. Endymion and her crew won many races and owned several records during her era. The most notable of her records, held for five years, was the Transatlantic crossing record (Sandy Hook to The Needles) set in 1900 of 13 days 20 hours 36 minutes. Originally built for George Lord Day of the prominent law firm Lord, Day, Lord.

== Origin ==
The two masted schooner Endymion was designed by C.H. Crane of Tam, Lemoine, and Crane of New York City and built at the George Lawley & Son shipyard in Boston, Massachusetts. Originally commissioned for a prominent New York lawyer named George Lord Day, he died before she launched and was sold to professional yachtsman Lauder, of the Lauder Greenway Family, in January 1899.

=== Etymology of the name ===
The yacht is named for Endymion, from Greek mythology. There is some debate as to Endymion's correct identity, various sources suggesting a king, a shepherd or an astronomer. Pliny the Elder believes that Endymion was an astronomer, the first human to observe the movements of the moon, which connects Endymion to the intimate relationship between astronomy and sailing – which was still strong when the schooner Endymion was named.

== Design & Career ==
Described in the New York Times in 1901 as "perhaps the largest schooner in the country", the Endymion sailed in numerous regattas including the Kaiser's Cup to Bermuda and the Sandy Hook to Needles Race. Her captain was James Loesch for a majority of these races.

== Post Competitive Use & Fate ==
After the untimely death of Lauder in 1916, his family sold the yacht to Mr. Charles D. Vail of Palm Beach, Florida. It is unknown what happened to her after this.

== See also ==
- List of large sailing yachts
- List of schooners
