= John Campbell Greenway =

American soldier and businessman

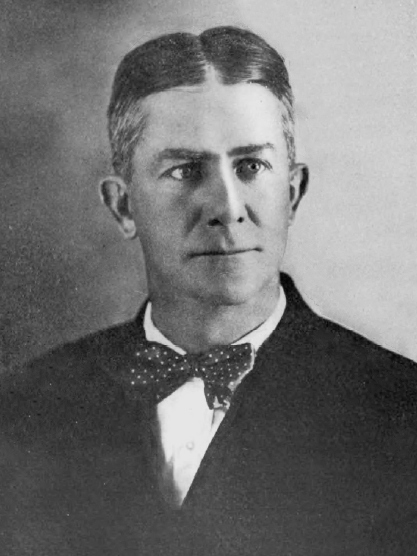
- Born: July 6, 1872; Huntsville, Alabama, U.S.
- Died: January 19, 1926 (aged 53); New York City, U.S.
- Resting place: Dinsmore Cemetery, Boone County, Kentucky, U.S. 39°00′02.2″N 84°48′54.8″W
- Education: Yale University (PhB)
- Occupation: Businessman
- Spouse: Isabella Greenway
- Relatives: Ephraim McDowell (great-great-grandfather)
- Military career
- Allegiance: United States
- Branch: United States Army
- Service years: 1898–1901; 1917–1926
- Rank: Brigadier General
- Commands: 101st Infantry Regiment; 409th Infantry Regiment; 205th Infantry Brigade
- Conflicts: Spanish–American War: San Juan Hill; Las Guasimas; World War I: Cantigny; Cambrai; Saint-Mihiel; Château-Thierry; Meuse-Argonne; Defensive Sector
- Awards: Distinguished Service Cross; Silver Star; Croix de Guerre (France); Legion of Honor (France); Ordre de l'Étoile Noire (France)

John Campbell Greenway (July 6, 1872 – January 19, 1926) was an American businessman and senior officer of the U.S. Army Reserve who served with Colonel Theodore Roosevelt in the Spanish–American War and commanded infantry in World War I. He was the husband of U.S. congresswoman Isabella Greenway.

== Early life and education ==
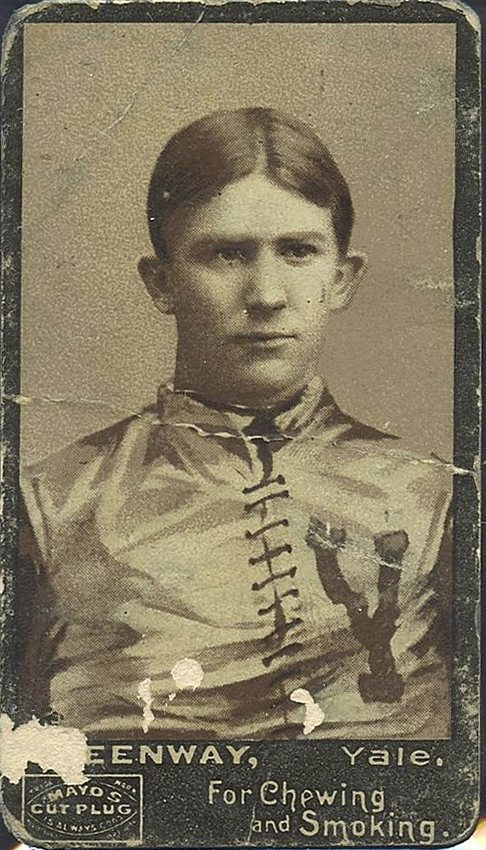
Greenway on a Mayo's Cut Plug card, the first-ever American football card set, 1894

John Campbell Greenway was born in Huntsville, Alabama, to Dr. Gilbert C. and Alice White Greenway. On both sides, he was a direct descendant of a line of notable Americans dating to before, and during, the American Revolutionary War including William Campbell, Isaac Shelby, Samuel McDowell, Ephraim McDowell, and Addison White. He attended Phillips Academy, Andover, attended Episcopal High School, attended the University of Virginia before completing a PhB in 1895 from the Sheffield Scientific School at Yale University. He was a member of the Book and Snake secret society, president of his class, and a member of noted the Yale Football teams from 1892 to 1895 that went a combined 52–1–2 and were national champions four years in a row. Immediately following graduation, he joined the Carnegie Steel Company where he worked briefly before being commissioned in the 1st Volunteer Cavalry of the U.S. Volunteers at the outset of the Spanish–American War.

After being removed from active duty at the end of the Spanish–American War in 1899, Greenway returned to steel and mining and held executive positions in a number of mine, steel, and railroad companies. He supervised development of United States Steel's open pit Canisteo Mine and Trout Lake Washing Plant in Coleraine, Minnesota, one of the first large-scale iron ore benefication plants in the world. Following the successful commissioning of the Trout Lake plant, in 1911 Greenway was recruited by the Calumet and Arizona Mining Company (led by former US Steel executives, the combined entity created by J.P. Morgan which included Carnegie Steel) to develop their newly acquired New Cornelia Mine in Ajo, Arizona. He developed the Ajo townsite and developed the New Cornelia into the first large open pit copper mine in Arizona. He also served one year as a regent of the University of Arizona before the United States entered World War I.

== Military career ==
=== Spanish–American War ===
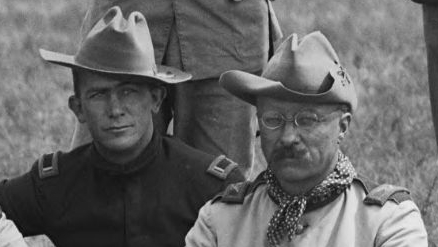
Greenway and Theodore Roosevelt in the Spanish-American War, 1898

Greenway volunteered for service in 1898 and joined Roosevelt's Rough Riders in the Spanish–American War. Originally commissioned a second lieutenant, he was then promoted to brevet then acting captain in the field by Colonel Roosevelt.

Greenway earned a Silver Star for his courageous service at the Battle of San Juan Hill. He is referenced on numerous occasions by Roosevelt in his book The Rough Riders and a book of Greenway's own correspondence was turned into a book entitled It Was the Grandest Sight I Ever Saw: Experiences of a Rough Rider As Recorded in the Letters of Lieutenant John Campbell Greenway. In his book, "The Rough Riders", Roosevelt said about Lieutenant Greenway:

"A strapping fellow, entirely fearless, modest and quiet, with the ability to take care of the men under him so as to bring them to the highest point of soldierly perfection, to be counted upon with absolute certainty in every emergency; not only doing his duty, but always on the watch to find some new duty which he could construe to be his, ready to respond with eagerness to the slightest suggestion of doing something, whether it was dangerous or merely difficult and laborious."

=== World War I ===
Greenway was returned to active service as a lieutenant colonel at the dawn of America entering World War I. Originally based at Toul Sector, he partook in the Battle of Cantigny, the first large-scale counterattack on German lines by the American Expeditionary Forces (AEF) with the 1st Battalion of the 26th Infantry, 1st Division, commanded by Major Theodore Roosevelt Jr., the son of his commander during the Spanish–American War, Theodore Roosevelt. During the war, Greenway would fight in numerous battles including Battle of Saint-Mihiel and the Battle of Château-Thierry. He was especially praised for his heroic conduct in battle and was cited for bravery at Cambrai. France awarded him the Croix de Guerre, the Legion of Honor, and the Ordre de l'Étoile Noire for commanding the 101st Infantry, 26th Division, during the Meuse-Argonne Offensive. He also received a Distinguished Service Cross and the World War I Victory Medal.

In late 1918, Colonel Greenway was severely gassed by German forces and honorably discharged from active service by the Army, though he remained active in the U.S. Army Reserve. He arrived back in Arizona in early 1919 to resume his role in the mining industries there.

=== Aftermath ===
In 1919 Greenway was promoted to the rank of colonel of the infantry, and three years later he was promoted to brigadier general. His post-war military career included work with Theodore Roosevelt Jr. for the Office of Naval Intelligence, the oldest branch of America's United States Intelligence Community.

== Personal life ==
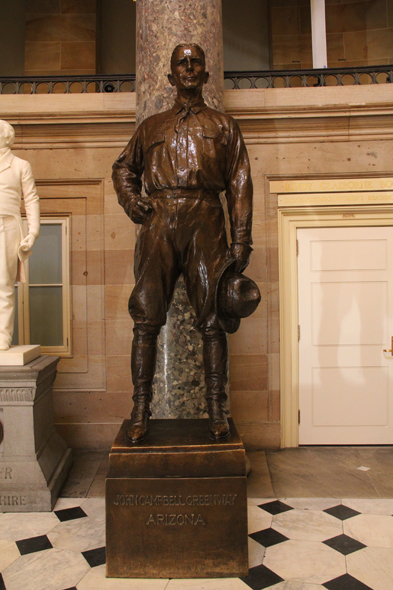
Statue in the Capitol Rotunda, Washington, D.C.

He was married to Isabella Munro-Ferguson, who served in the U.S. House of Representatives as a Democrat from 1933 to 1937 and was the first congresswoman from Arizona. They had one child, Jack. Greenway's brother, James C. Sr., married Harriet Lauder Greenway of the Lauder Greenway Family. His nephews include renowned ornithologist and Naval Intelligence Officer James Cowan Greenway and arts patron G. Lauder Greenway, longtime chairman of the Metropolitan Opera Guild, New York.

== Legacy ==
In 1930 Arizona placed Gutzon Borglum's statue of Greenway in the U.S. Capitol's National Statuary Hall Collection. The statue remained there until being replaced in 2015 by one of Barry Goldwater; the Greenway statue was moved to the Polly Rosenbaum Archives and History Building near the Arizona State Capitol in Phoenix. There is another casting of the Borglum statue in Tucson.

A Charles Henry Niehaus statue of Greenway's great-great-grandfather, Dr. Ephraim McDowell, was placed in the National Statuary Hall in 1929 by Kentucky, making them the only direct relatives to have shared the honor.

Greenway Road in Phoenix, Arizona, Greenway High School in Phoenix, Greenway Public Schools in Coleraine, Minnesota, and Greenway Township, Itasca County, Minnesota are named in his honor.

== See also ==
- List of members of the American Legion
- List of people from Alabama
- List of Yale University people

== Other sources ==
- Boice, Donald (1975) John C. Greenway and the Opening of the Western Mesabi (Itasca Community College Foundation)
