= Korean War Memorial (Olympia, Washington) =

War memorial in Olympia, Washington, U.S.

- United States
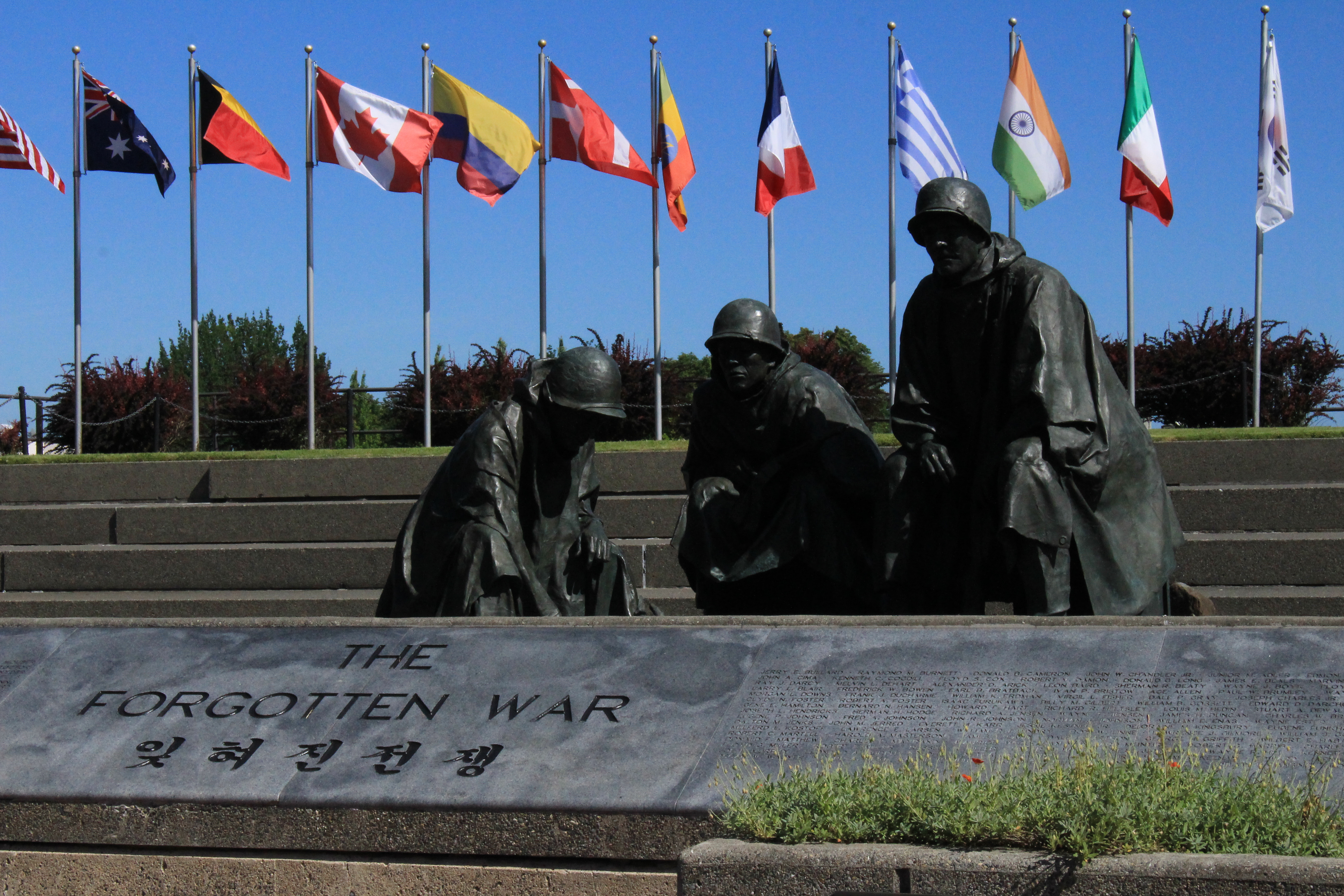
- Used for those deceased
- Established: July 24, 1993
- Location: 47.035307°N 122.899673°W; Washington State Capitol, Olympia, Washington, U.S.

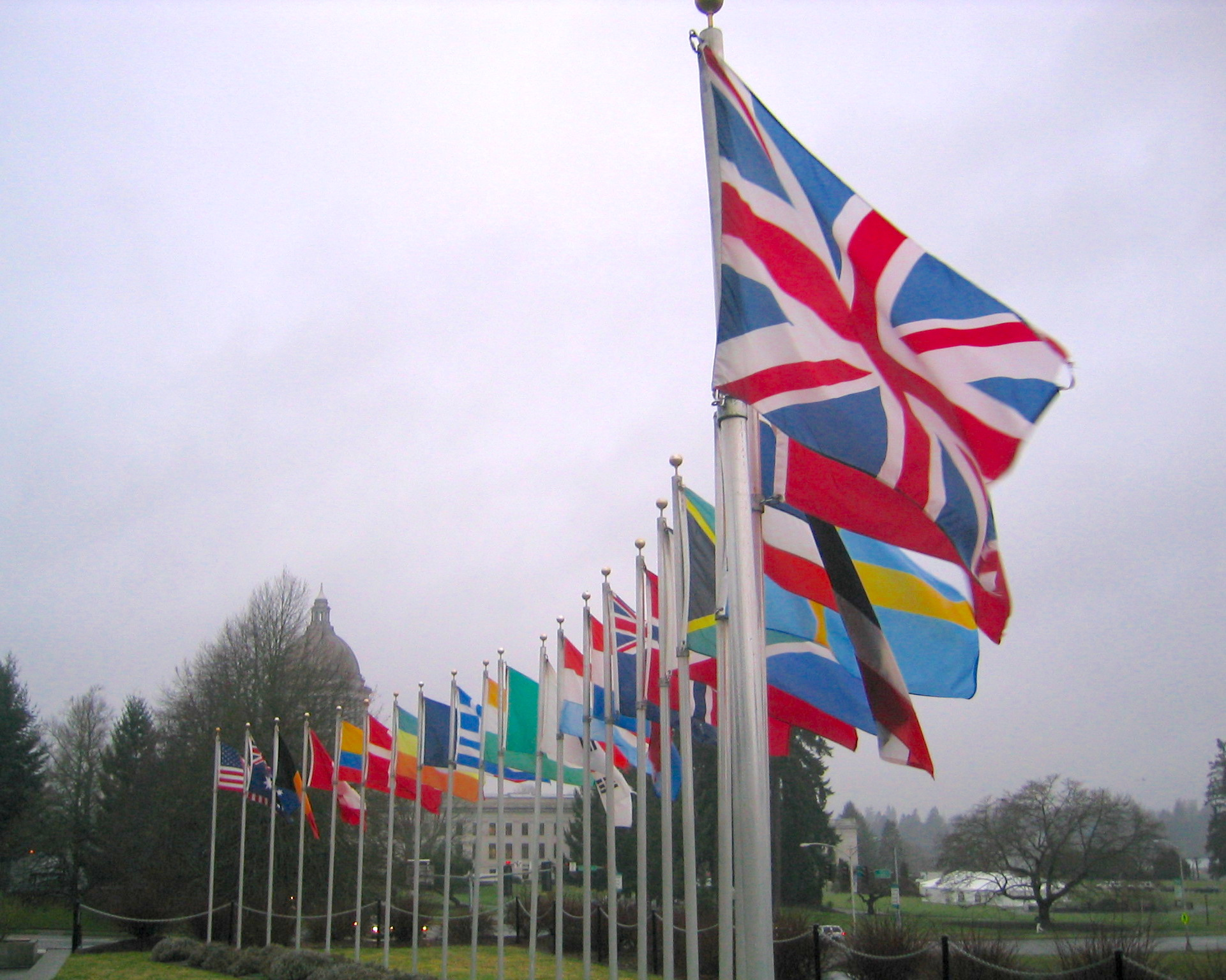
Flags displayed at the memorial

The Korean War Memorial by artist Deborah Copenhaver Fellows is installed on the Washington State Capitol campus in Olympia, Washington, United States. Dedicated on July 24, 1993, the memorial features bronze figures.

== See also ==
- List of Korean War memorials
