= Polly Lauder Tunney =

American philanthropist (1907–2008)

- Lauder and Gene Tunney after marrying in 1928
- Born: Mary Josephine Lauder; April 24, 1907; Greenwich, Connecticut, US
- Died: April 12, 2008 (aged 100); Stamford, Connecticut, US
- Occupations: philanthropist, socialite
- Spouse: Gene Tunney (m. 1928; died 1978)
- Children: 4 (incl. John)
- Relatives: Lauder Greenway Family

Polly Lauder Tunney (born Mary Josephine Lauder; April 24, 1907 – April 12, 2008) was an American philanthropist and Connecticut socialite. An heiress to the United States Steel fortune through her grandfather George Lauder and her great-uncle Andrew Carnegie, Tunney drew international fame during the 1920s for her secret romance and subsequent marriage to world heavyweight boxing champion Gene Tunney. She almost died on her honeymoon of an abscessed appendicitis on the Croatian Islands of Brijuni. They had four children, including John V. Tunney (1934-2018), who was a U.S. representative and U.S. senator from California from 1965 until 1977.

Tunney was an active supporter of the arts. She served on the board of the Metropolitan Opera Guild from 1951 to 1970 alongside her first cousin G. Lauder Greenway and was the board's vice president from 1956 to 1959. She was later a member of the Guild's emeritus council from 1970 to 1992. She was also a major benefactor of the Audubon Society and the National Wildlife Federation. Lauder died two weeks short of her 101st birthday in April 2008.
