= Lauder Greenway Estate =

Coordinates: 41.0189°N 73.6018°W

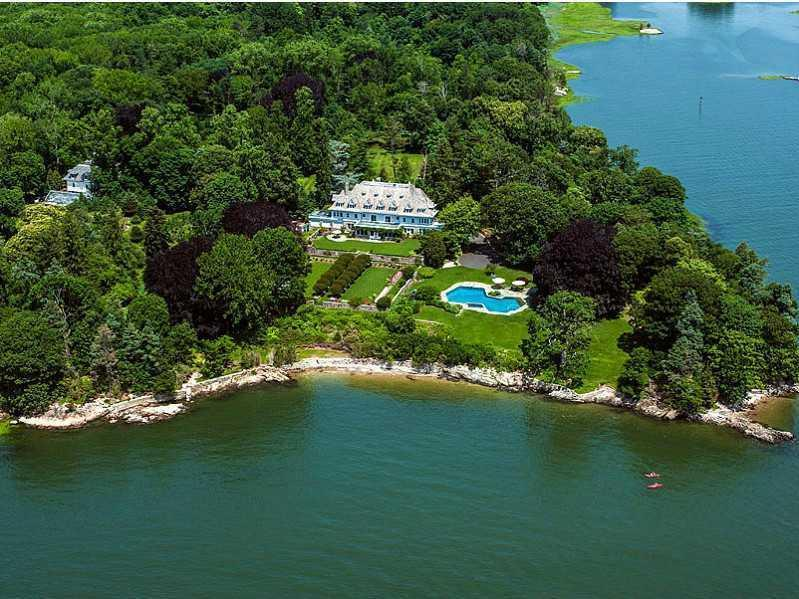
- Interactive map of the Lauder Greenway Estate area
- Alternative names: Copper Beech Farm

General information
- Type: Mansion
- Architectural style: French Renaissance
- Location: 499 Indian Field Road, Greenwich, Connecticut, United States
- Completed: 1896

Copper Beech Farm, formerly the Lauder Greenway Estate, is a 50-acre (20 ha) private property with a French Renaissance mansion in Greenwich, Connecticut. For a time, it was the most expensive home in the history of the United States.

Built for industrialist John Hamilton Gourlie in 1896, it was purchased by the Lauder Greenway Family in 1905 and would stay in that family's hands for a majority of its existence. It is the largest surviving Gilded Age mansion in Connecticut.

== History ==
The property was purchased by Dr. James C. Greenway and his wife Harriet Lauder Greenway, the daughter of multi-billionaire (in today's currency) George Lauder and niece of Andrew Carnegie, one of the wealthiest Americans ever, in 1905. At the time of purchase, the estate included 57 acres (23 ha) and included fruit-bearing orchards, a chicken and pig farm, as well as the house, to which the family added two wings in the early 1910s.

In the coming years, the stone-and-shingle mansion, built in the French Renaissance fashion, would crown an estate that grew to more than 100 acres (40 ha) at one time. Then the family began donating large parcels of land for various causes. In 1918, for example, James and Harriet gifted one of the islands to the town of Greenwich; the property, located about two miles south of Greenwich Harbor, now serves as the popular Island Beach. The couple donated the first ferry providing transportation to the beach for town residents two years later.

By 1920, the estate housed several generations of the Lauder Greenway family including George Lauder, Dr. and Mrs. Greenway, and their sons G. Lauder Greenway, James Greenway, and Gilbert Greenway, and their daughter Ann who would later marry John Griswold of the Griswold Family. After the death of Mrs. Greenway's brother George Lauder Jr. and the sale of his Greenwich estate "Tignabruick" (since demolished), the estate was the gathering place for the wider family.

This estate remained in their hands until the death of G. Lauder Greenway, who had died childless, after which the estate was sold privately.

== Description ==
=== Main house ===
The main house spans 15,000 square feet (1,400 m^{2}) across four floors. It has 12 bedrooms scattered among the top two floors, seven full baths, and two powder rooms. A dark cherry wood-paneled library with curving corners and glass-fronted bookcases typical of the Victorian era sits off of a three-story wood-paneled entry. The dining room has oak columns, a fireplace, and an ornate plaster tracery ceiling. There is also a garden room, with walls of windows looking out on the water and a solarium with stone-tiled floors and a fountain adorning the back wall. A wine cellar, a third-floor staff wing, and a three-story. The current main kitchen is tucked down a hallway, accessible by discreetly hidden doors in the wood-paneled entry foyer and sits at the end of the house. Its dumb waiter allows access to the home's original kitchen, located in the basement among the additional staff quarters.

Fireplaces adorn nearly every entertaining space and many of the bedrooms open onto sleeping porches once used during summer months before the advent of air conditioning. In the entry space, an antique open-air elevator that one might expect to find in a throwback Parisian hotel chugs slowly between floors at the push of a button.

=== Outbuildings ===
The grounds begin with a 1,500-foot (460 m) driveway accessed through a three-bedroom gatehouse then a forest. Within the main compound, there is a stone carriage house with a clock tower, a six-car garage, and multiple greenhouses.

A 16-sided pool faces the Long Island Sound, accompanied by an adjoining spa and a nearby Victorian tea pagoda turned pool house, plus a grass tennis court. The antique squash court has been converted into an unknown space.

=== Gardens and waterfront ===
A cast-iron gate swings open onto sunken gardens. Palm trees grace the terraced lawns above a private, century-old apple orchard.

The estate has roughly one mile of water frontage and a private island off the coast. The banks of the property are perched above a sandy beach, also private to the estate, accessible by wooden stairs. The backyard sits 40 feet above mean tide, meaning it remains a safe distance from the sea.

== Today ==
The entire estate was sold in 2014 to an unnamed buyer for $120,000,000. The entire estate was sold once again on August 2, 2023 for the price of $138,830,000

== See also ==
- List of Gilded Age mansions
- Kykuit
- Marble House
