= Putnam Cemetery =

Cemetery in Fairfield County, Connecticut

Coordinates: 41°03′26″N 73°37′18″W

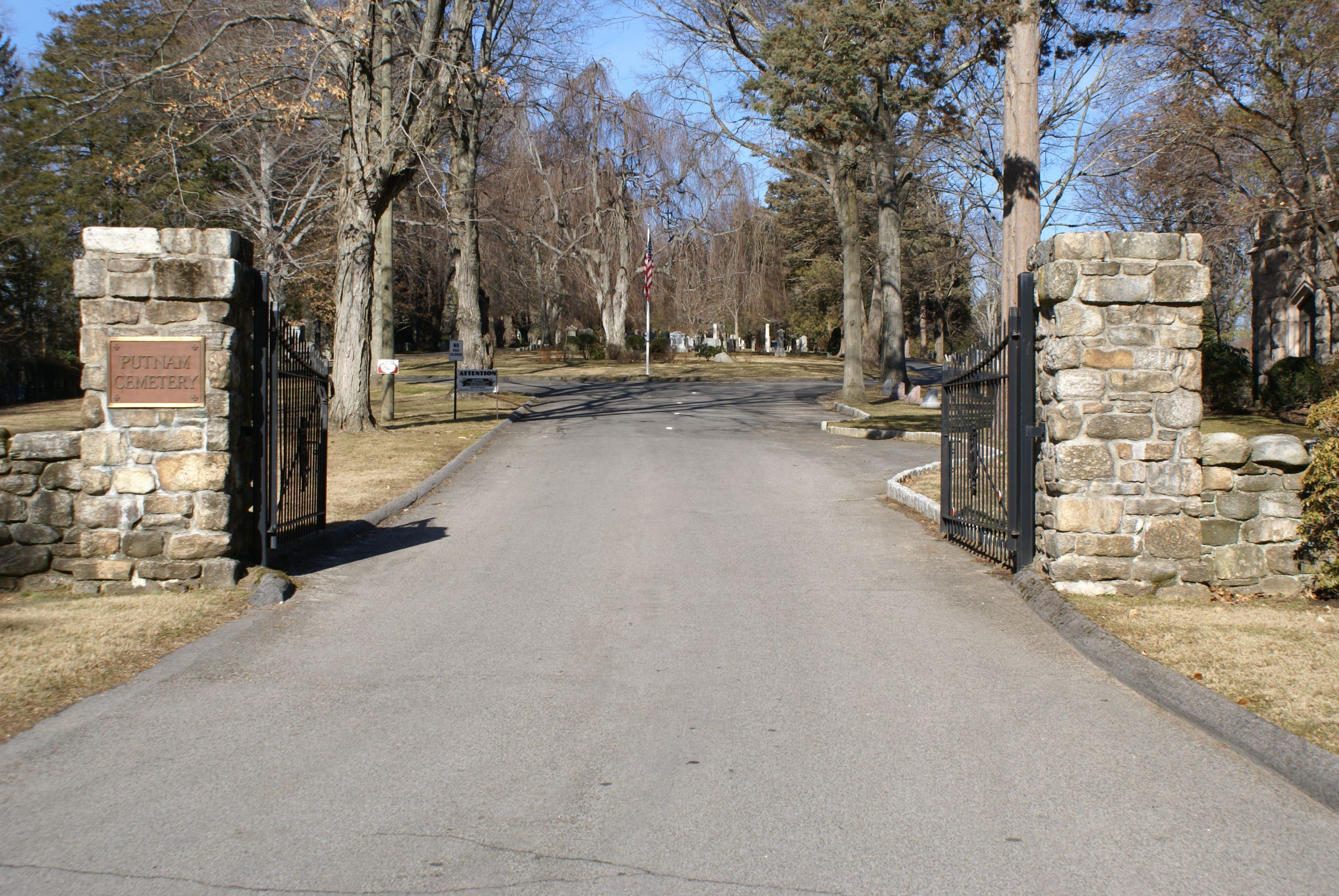
The main entrance of Putnam Cemetery

Putnam Cemetery is a non-sectarian cemetery located at 35 Parsonage Road in Greenwich, Connecticut. It is affiliated with adjacent Saint Mary's Cemetery at 399 North Street, which is a Catholic cemetery; the two cemeteries share the same office. The cemetery is located in a quiet residential neighborhood and is the final resting place of several notable people.

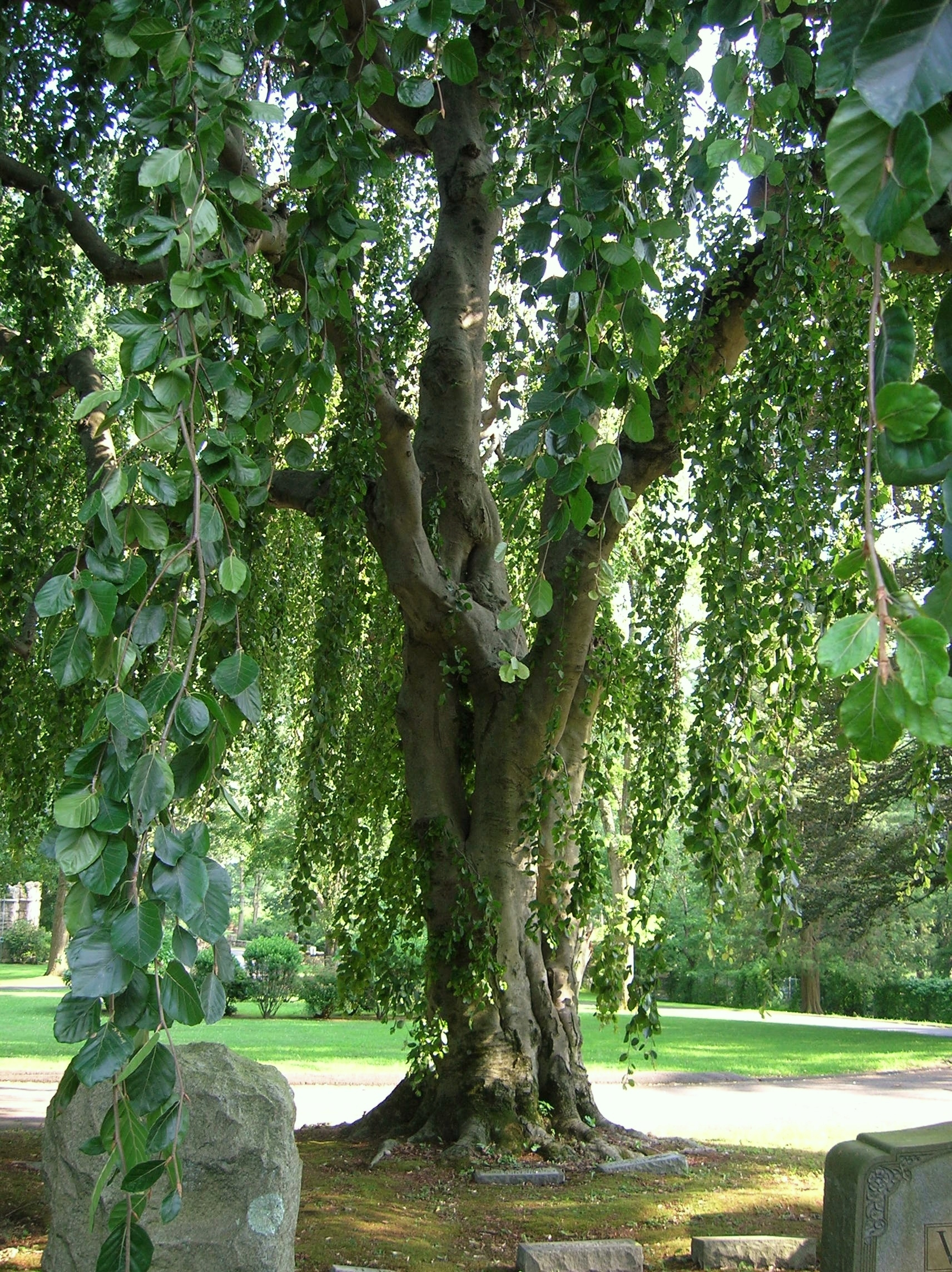
Weeping European beech tree in Putnam Cemetery

== Putnam division ==
- Elizabeth Milbank Anderson (1850–1921), philanthropist
- Victor Borge (1909–2000), pianist, symphony conductor, comedian
- Grace Lincoln Hall Brosseau (1872–1959), socialite, writer, and President General of the Daughters of the American Revolution
- Prescott Bush (1895–1972), US Senator, and Dorothy Walker Bush (1901–1992), presidential parents and grandparents
- Bud Collyer (1908–1969), television show host
- G. Lauder Greenway (1904–1981), Chairman of the Metropolitan Opera Association and patron of the arts
- James Cowan Greenway (1903–1989), Ornithologist, Curator of Birds at the Museum of Comparative Zoology at Harvard
- Thomas Hastings (1860–1929), architect
- Eugene Holman (1895–1962), president and chairman of the Standard Oil Company of New Jersey
- William Temple Hornaday (1854–1937), wildlife conservationist, director of the N.Y. Zoological Park
- George Lauder (1837–1924), Scottish-American industrialist
- Alden McWilliams (1916–1993), cartoonist
- Jeremiah Milbank (1818–1884), co-founder, Borden's Milk Company
- Martha Elizabeth Moxley (1960–1975), murder victim
- Ezio Pinza (1892–1957), opera singer
- Townsend Scudder (1865–1960), US Congressman
- Anya Seton (1916–1990), author
- Walter Clark Teagle (1878–1962), president and chairman of the Standard Oil Company of New Jersey
- Alec Templeton (1909–1963), composer & pianist
- Douglass Watson (1921–1989), actor
- Lowell P. Weicker Jr. (1931-2023), 85th Governor of Connecticut
- Lebbeus R. Wilfley (1866–1926), international judge

== Saint Mary's division ==
- Jack Lescoulie (1912–1987), television show host
- Eddie Lopat (1918–1992), Major League Baseball player & manager
- Albert P. Morano (1908–1987), US Congressman
- William Ryan (1840–1925), US Congressman
- George Skakel (1892–1955) and wife Ann Brannack (1892–1955), parents of Ethel Kennedy
- William L. Tierney (1876–1958), US Congressman
- Leonard Warren (1911–1960), American baritone
