= G. Lauder Greenway =

American philanthropist

- Born: June 10, 1904; Greenwich, Connecticut, U.S.
- Died: June 22, 1981 (aged 77); Greenwich, Connecticut, U.S.
- Resting place: Putnam Cemetery
- Education: Yale and Cambridge
- Occupations: Professor and philanthropist
- Known for: Chairman, Metropolitan Opera Association
- Parent(s): James Greenway Sr. Harriet Lauder Greenway
- Family: Lauder-Greenway family

G. Lauder Greenway (June 10, 1904 – June 22, 1981) was a prolific patron of the arts in the 20th century, especially the opera where he was the longtime chairman of the Metropolitan Opera Association. He was also the director of the New York Philharmonic which led to his deep involvement in the creation of Lincoln Center on whose board he also served. Outside of musical arts, he served as vice-chairman of the Institute of Fine Arts of New York University from 1946 to 1948, as its acting director from 1948 to 1951 then became chairman of the institute's advisory committee during which he orchestrated the acquisition and conversion of the James B. Duke House as the institutes headquarters. He was also on the board of the Metropolitan Museum of Art for several years.

== Biography ==
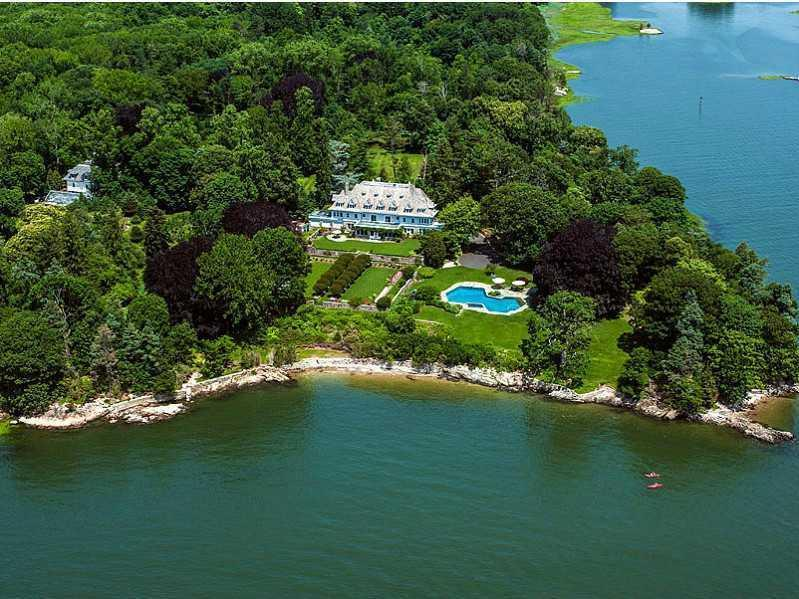
Lauder Greenway Estate

Lauder Greenway was born in Greenwich, Connecticut as the second of three sons to James Greenway Sr. and his wife, Harriet Lauder Greenway. As a member of the Lauder Greenway Family, Greenway's maternal grandfather was George Lauder and his great-uncle was Andrew Carnegie which informed and empowered his philanthropic efforts. Greenway would live his entire life, less his years at boarding school and university, at his family's Lauder Greenway Estate in Greenwich.

=== Education ===
Greenway was educated at Choate and Taft School in high school, then graduated from Yale in 1925 with a bachelor's degree, a master's degree from Cambridge in 1926, and a PhD from Yale in 1930. During his PhD studies (1927–28) and immediately following (1931–32), Greenway was an instructor in English at Yale. In 1958, Mr. Greenway was awarded an honorary doctorate in fine arts from New York University. He was cited as a zealous champion of the classic humanities in this cornucopian age of ingenious mechanics.

== Arts Patron ==
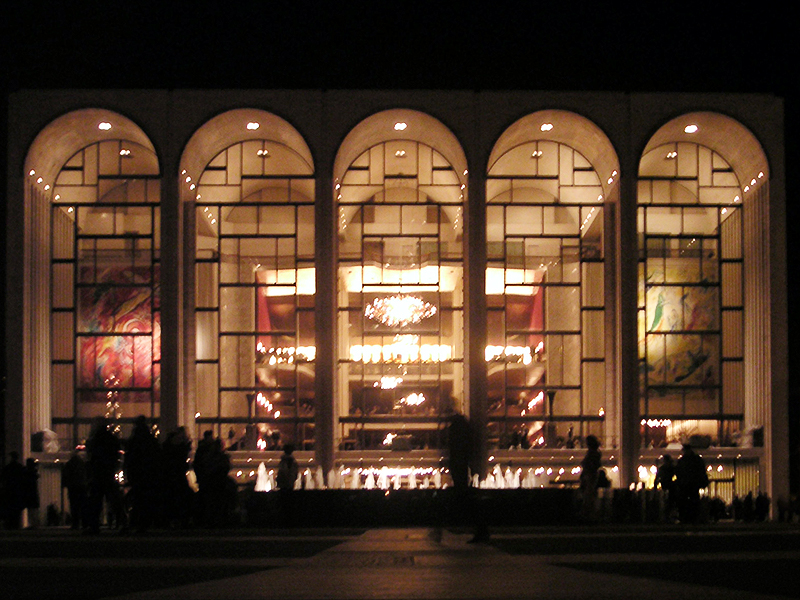
Metropolitan Opera House

=== Metropolitan Opera Company ===
After becoming a member of the board of the Metropolitan Opera Association in 1942, he went on to serve as vice-chairman. From 1956 to 1970, Greenway served as chairman of the association, which runs the opera company itself. This was a volatile period for the opera as it had begun to outgrow its original home.

He served as honorary chairman of the association from 1970 to 1975 and was an honorary director from 1977 till his death in 1981.

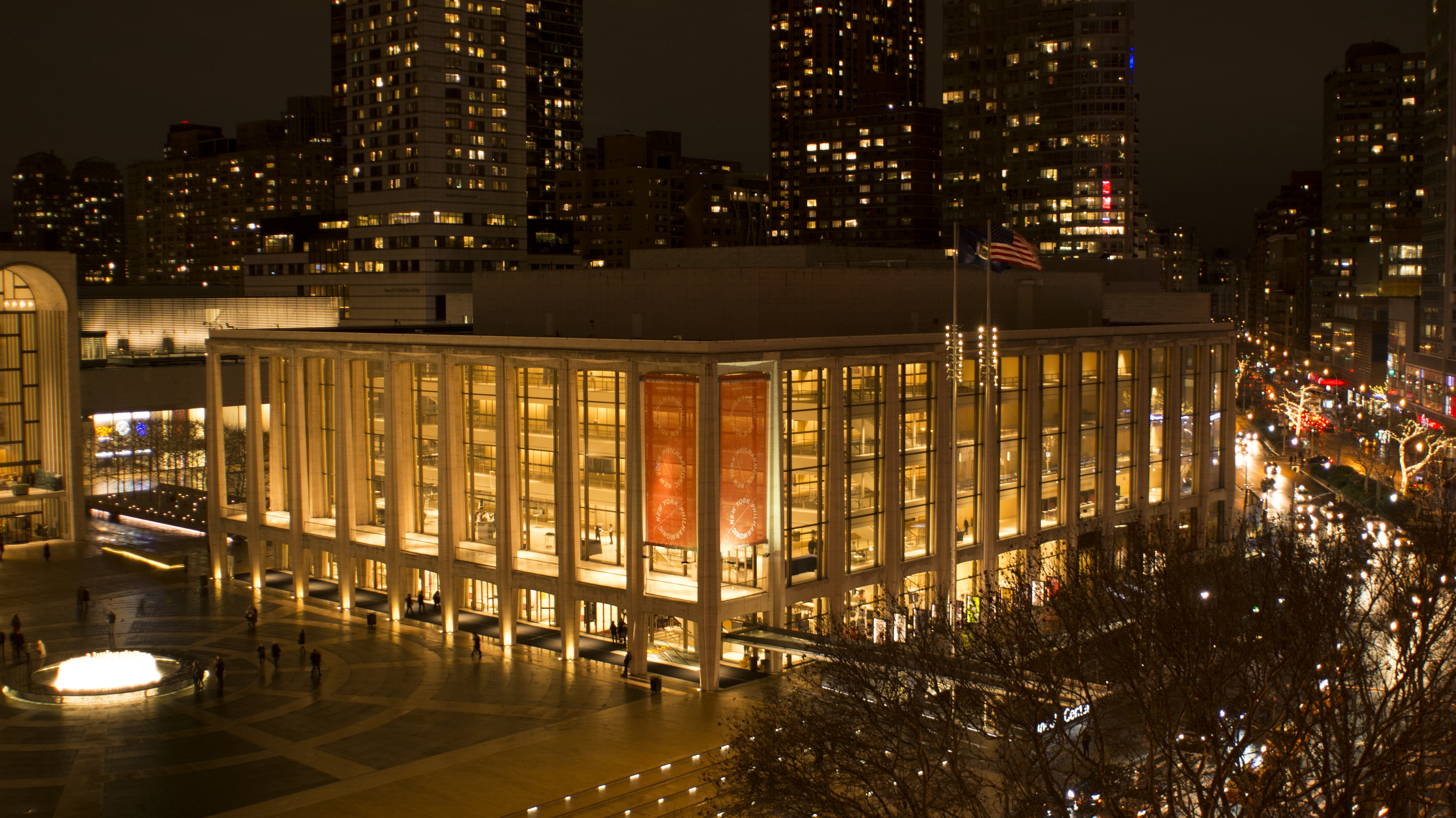
Home of the Philharmonic

=== New York Philharmonic ===
Greenway was a director of the New York Philharmonic from 1948 to 1970.

=== Lincoln Center ===
Greenway, as the chairman of the opera and a director of the New York Philharmonic, was instrumental in working with John D. Rockefeller III in the establishment, construction, and adoption of Lincoln Center.

He was a member of the board of Lincoln Center from 1964 to 1973.

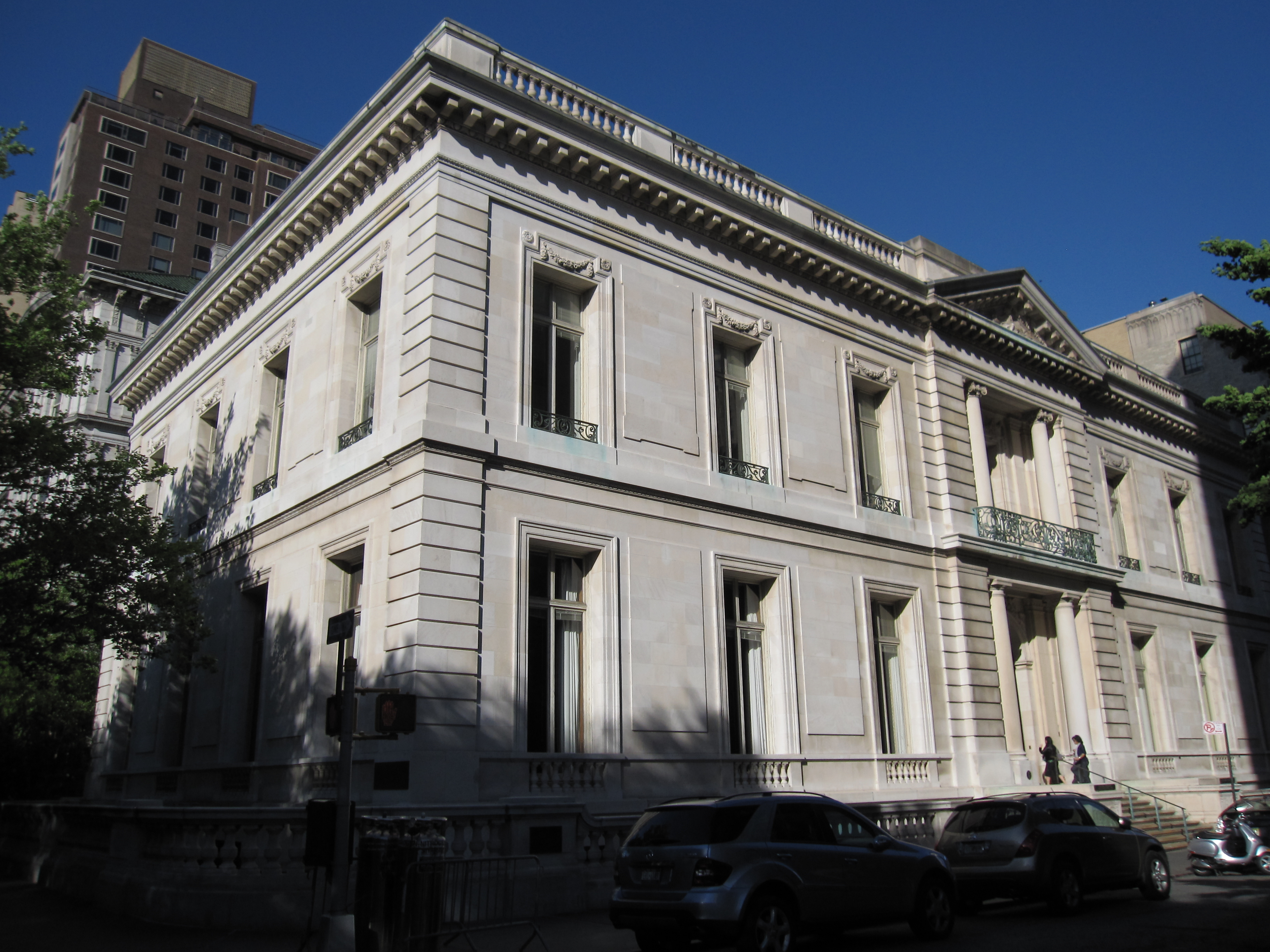
James B. Duke House

=== NYU Institute of Fine Arts ===
Long an admirer of the fine arts, Greenway served as vice chairman of the Institute of Fine Arts of New York University from 1946 to 1948, as its acting director from 1948 to 1951, and became chairman of the institute's Advisory Committee from 1951 onward. It was under Greenway's leadership alongside Craig Smyth that the institute was able to acquire and convert the James B. Duke House as its new home in 1958.

=== Metropolitan Museum of Art ===
Greenway was on the board of directors for the Metropolitan Museum of Art from 1932 till 1941. From 1932 to 1940 he acted as assistant secretary, and was elected secretary of the board in 1940 and 1941.

== Personal life ==
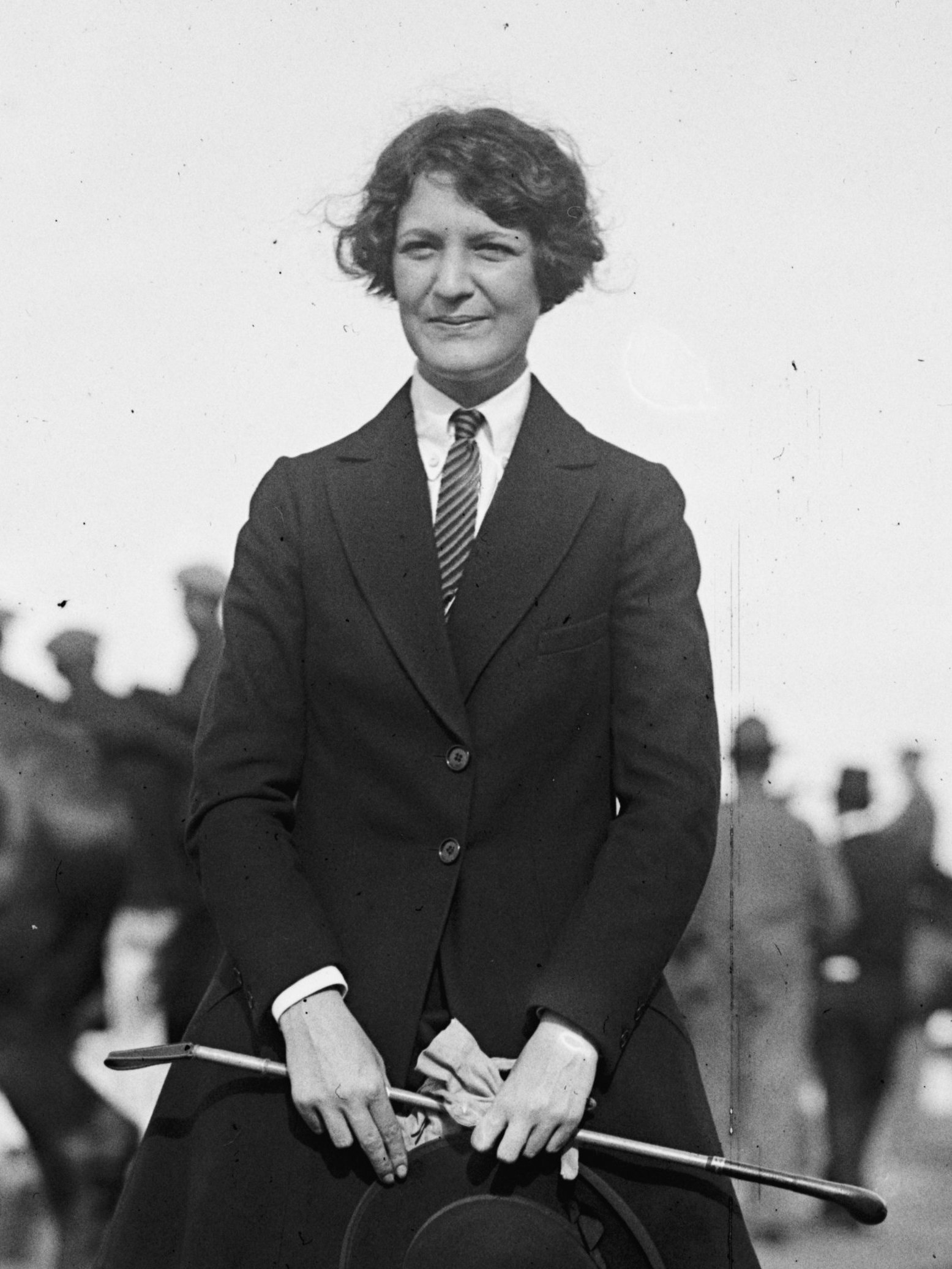
Alisa Mellon Bruce

Greenway never married and died childless, though was in a long rumored relationship with Ailsa Mellon Bruce after her divorce from David Kirkpatrick Este Bruce.

Mrs. Bruce's father was banker Andrew W. Mellon, the CEO of Mellon Bank, who was instrumental in converting the Lauder Greenway and Carnegie's family business from the Carnegie Steel Corporation to U.S. Steel. In addition to their personal links, Greenway was a longtime trustee of Bruce's Avalon Foundation.

== Family ==
As member of the Lauder-Greenway family, Greenway was an heir to the U.S. Steel fortune through the Lauder side. His mother, Harriet Lauder Greenway, was the daughter of George Lauder and niece of Andrew Carnegie. The elder men were business partners and built the Carnegie Steel Company together.

His father, James Greenway Sr. and mother Harriet provided the endowment to create the Yale School of Public Health. His uncle, John Campbell Greenway, was a Rough Rider with Teddy Roosevelt and a highly decorated World War I general while his aunt, Isabella Greenway, was one of the first female representatives in the U.S. Congress from Arizona and a close friend of Eleanor Roosevelt and Franklin D. Roosevelt.

Greenways brothers were all Yale graduates like Lauder; his younger brother, Gilbert C. Greenway, was a pioneering pilot who later served in the Dwight D. Eisenhower administration as the deputy assistant secretary of the United States Air Force after serving as an officer in the CIA. Upon retiring he was the chairman of the Lyford Cay Club in The Bahamas. His elder brother, James Cowan Greenway, was a prominent figure in ornithology who led Harvard's Museum of Comparative Zoology.

Lauder's first cousin, Polly Lauder Tunney, was a longtime collaborator of his at the Metropolitan Opera Association and the wife of World Heavyweight boxing champion Gene Tunney.
