= Inland Northwest Vietnam Veterans Memorial =

Memorial in Spokane, Washington

- Completion date: 1984
- Medium: Bronze
- Subject: Vietnam War
- Weight: 400 pounds (180 kg) plus 3,400-pound (1,500 kg) base
- Location: Spokane, Washington
- Owner: City of Spokane

The Inland Northwest Vietnam Veterans Memorial in Spokane, Washington was designed by Deborah Copenhaver Fellows. The memorial is a bronze statue of a male soldier holding a letter. The bronze part weighs 400 pounds (180 kg), and the granite base weighs 3,400 pounds (1,500 kg). The artist's commission was $95,000, raised through local donations after Portland, Oregon made a bid to buy the statue. It was created in 1984, and dedicated on November 11, 1985, after installation in Riverfront Park.
