= George V. Lauder (CIA) =

American spy

Director of Public Affairs, CIA
- In office November 8, 1983 – 1987
- President: Ronald Reagan

Deputy Inspector General, CIA
- In office 1978 – November 7, 1983
- President: Jimmy Carter; Ronald Reagan

Personal details
- Born: March 2, 1924 New York City, U.S.
- Died: July 25, 2012 (aged 88) Washington, D.C., U.S.
- Relations: Lauder Greenway Family
- Education: Yale; University of Virginia
- Awards: Distinguished Intelligence Medal; Intelligence Medal of Merit

George Varick Lauder (March 2, 1924 – July 25, 2012) was an American spy. A thirty-six year veteran of the Central Intelligence Agency, he is best known (publicly) as their Director of Public Affairs in the 1980s as the CIA began to recraft their public image after finding it difficult to shed the reputation it gained in the mid-1970's as a rogue agency accused of shocking abuses of power. Previous to masterminding the public perception of the agency, Lauder was the Deputy Inspector General, the acting Chief of Latin American Division, and held a number of classified posts before then.

== Early life ==
George Lauder was born in New York City to his parents Katherine Varick Lauder and Edwin Storrs Dewing. His parents divorced when he was very young and his mother gave her children her surname. Katherine Lauder was a member of the Lauder Greenway Family whose wealth allowed him to attend Andover, Yale for his undergraduate degree, and earn a law degree from the University of Virginia.

Lauders college education was interrupted by the advent of World War II, when he joined the U.S. Navy as a lieutenant and was a navigator for seaplanes and aircraft carriers in the South Pacific. He would ultimately graduate from the class of 1945 in 1947 from Yale.

== CIA ==
After graduating law school, Lauder joined the CIA in 1951. From 1951 until 1978 he was a covert operations officer posted in several countries.

=== Report on Cuban Complicity in the Assassination of JFK ===
At the direction of E. Henry Knoche, Lauder, while with the Latin American Division, lead a team in a comprehensive investigation into Cuban complicity into the assassination of President John F. Kennedy. From mid-October 1976 to June 1977, Lauder compiled a report that drew an extensive road map between a disgruntled La Cosa Nostra led by Santo Trafficante trying to have Fidel Castro, Raúl Castro, and Che Guevara assassinated instead. In one of the final nails in the coffin of JFK conspiracy theories, the report found no clear links between the Cuban government and the killing.

Soon after this report was filed by Lauder, he left covert operations on an unconfirmed date to become the Deputy Inspector General for the CIA.

=== Director of Public Affairs ===
In 1981, there was a significant expansion of the CIA. Overseas operations had expanded, including covert actions intended to influence events in other countries, and President Reagan had given the agency authority to conduct operations within the United States. By 1983, the ramifications of this expansion were being felt and late that year, William J. Casey, the Director of Central Intelligence, named Lauder the Director of Public Affairs.

Over the course of his tenure, Lauder was the agencies public face to the United States amidst the end of the Cold War, the Nicaraguan Contras affair, Iran Contra, the 1985 Beirut car bombings, and other seminal events in the history of the CIA. Lauder was also constantly sparring with journalists such as David Ignatius, Bob Woodward, and Jack Nelson.

Lauders departure from the CIA in May 1987 coincided with the death of Casey and the start of congressional hearings on the Iran Contra scandal.

==== Awards & Citations ====
Over the course of his career, Lauder received the CIA's Distinguished Intelligence Medal and Intelligence Medal of Merit.

== Family ==
Lauder married Laurita Blatz on April 25, 1952. They had four children together including daughters Frederica Lauder and Leigh Lauder and a son, George V. Lauder of the Museum of Comparative Zoology at Harvard.

== Additional Reading ==
- Messages Declassified by the CIA to or from George Lauder (366 in total)
