= George Lauder Sr. =

Scottish politician

George Lauder
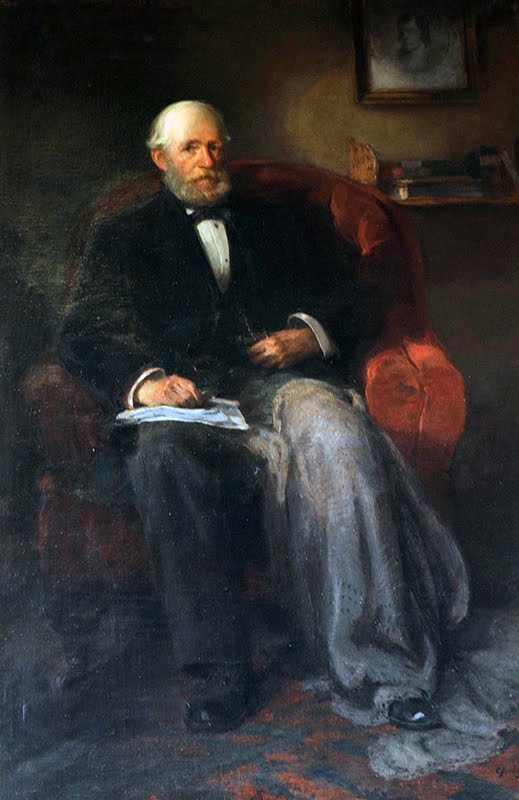
- Born: 9 May 1815; Dunfermline, Fife, Scotland
- Died: 18 November 1901 (aged 86); Dunfermline, Fife, Scotland
- Occupations: Politician, business
- Known for: Scottish politics and surrogate father to Andrew Carnegie (nephew)
- Spouse: Seaton Morrison
- Children: George Lauder
- Relatives: Andrew Carnegie (nephew); Thomas M. Carnegie (nephew)
- Family: Lauder Greenway Family

George Lauder (9 May 1815 – 18 November 1901) was a political leader in Scotland who was the father of Scottish industrialist George Lauder and surrogate father to his nephew Andrew Carnegie. He was the also the progenitor of the Lauder Greenway Family. Lauder has been described as Carnegie's "intellectual father." Lauder was consistently credited by Carnegie throughout his lifetime, saying in his 1920 autobiography: "...a man whose influence on me cannot be underestimated, my Uncle Lauder."

== Early life ==
Lauder. was born in Dunfermline, Scotland to George Lauder and Margaret Muir. His father was a well-to-do owner of a snuff mill that he had inherited from his father. At 25, Lauder opened a shop on 8 High Street Dunfermline (which still stands today, although it is now a café) which would become a de facto school for his nephew and son.

== Civic life ==
As a Chartist, Lauder was deeply involved in securing democratic enfranchisement (voting rights) for all citizens of the United Kingdom which at the time limited legal voting to landowners only. Lauder also championed educational rights reasoning that education was the only sure opportunity for men to achieve anything beyond their initial means.

Lauder was closely aligned with his father-in-law, the "fiery orator" Bailie Thomas Morrison, who led the advanced wing of the Radicals in the region.

== Influence on Andrew Carnegie ==
Due to his relative affluence, Lauder was well educated and was deeply involved in the formation of Carnegie's worldview.

When the Carnegie family decided to move to the United States, they were struggling to make ends meet. It was Lauder who lent them the money to emigrate. While maintaining correspondence with his young nephew, Lauder groomed his son George as an engineer which led to him working with Lord Kelvin at Glasgow University. The two younger men, inseparable friends, were also in regular touch as one, Carnegie, would begin to consolidate his control over the manufacture of metals such as steel, while the other, Lauder, would rise as a leading expert on the creation of such metals.

By 1890, Carnegie and Lauder (son) were business partners in their sprawling empire and the influence of Lauder (father) would unfurl. Carnegie was determined to have a positive effect on the world and provide opportunities for education for all to level the playing field. This manifested in the public library system created by Carnegie, the myriad institutes and endowments for peace, and a number of universities and colleges including Carnegie Mellon University and Lauder College in his hometown of Dunfermline, Scotland.

=== Lauder College ===
As part of Lauder's commitment to equitable education opportunities in Scotland, he founded Lauder College, now known as Fife College, in 1899. The opening of the college was supported financially by Andrew Carnegie and George Lauder.
