= James Greenway =

American ornithologist (1903–1989)

Lt. Commander James Greenway
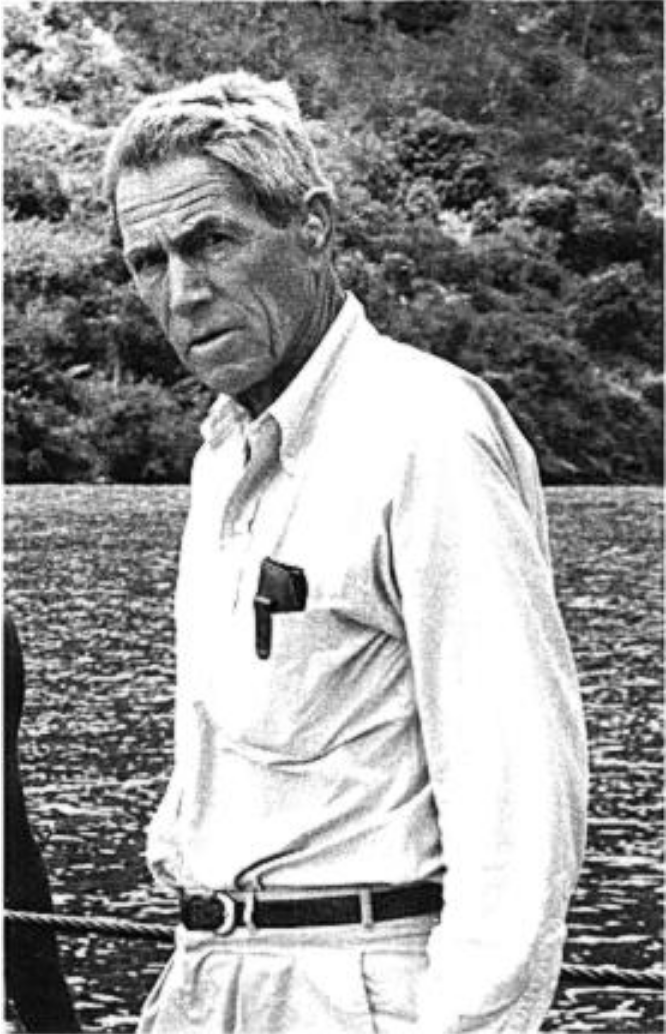
- James Greenway in c. 1970

Personal details
- Born: April 7, 1903 New York City, United States
- Died: June 10, 1989 (aged 86) Greenwich, Connecticut, United States
- Resting place: Putnam Cemetery
- Relatives: Lauder Greenway Family
- Education: Yale
- Occupation: Ornithologist, Curator, Naval Intelligence Officer
- Known for: Author, Extinct and Vanishing Birds of the World; Curator of Birds, Museum of Comparative Zoology (MCZ) at Harvard University

Military service
- Allegiance: United States
- Branch/service: United States Navy
- Rank: Lt. Commander
- Unit: Office of Naval Intelligence

James Cowan Greenway (April 7, 1903 – June 10, 1989) was an American ornithologist. An eccentric, shy, and often reclusive man, his survey of extinct and vanishing birds provided the base for much subsequent work on bird conservation.

== Early years ==
Greenway was born in New York City, though grew up on the Lauder Greenway Estate in Greenwich, Connecticut, with his brothers G. Lauder Greenway and Gilbert Greenway, as the son of James Greenway Sr., founder of the Yale School of Public Health. He is also a grandson of George Lauder and a great-grandson of George Lauder, Sr. He was educated at Phillips Exeter Academy, graduating in 1922, and graduated from Yale University in 1926 with a Bachelor of Arts degree. He then worked for a few years as a reporter for the Brooklyn Eagle newspaper.

== Expeditions and research ==
=== Expeditions with Delacour ===
In 1929 Greenway became a partner in the Franco-Anglo-American Zoological Expedition to Madagascar. The expedition was sponsored by the Muséum national d'histoire naturelle in Paris, the British Natural History Museum in London, and the American Museum of Natural History (AMNH) in New York City, and led by French ornithologist Jean Delacour. Greenway took part in the expedition from April to August 1929, after which he and Delacour left Madagascar for Delacour's fifth expedition to Indochina, where they collected zoological specimens in Tonkin and Annam.

At some point during his expedition to Annam, Greenway was awarded the Order of the Dragon of Annam by the local authorities. Later in the expedition deep inside the Kingdom of Laos, he was awarded the Order of the Million Elephants and the White Parasol in Luang Prabang. Presumably by King Sisavang Vong himself. When asked about the circumstances of the awards later, he responded: "Any outsider who even got to those places got a medal in those days."

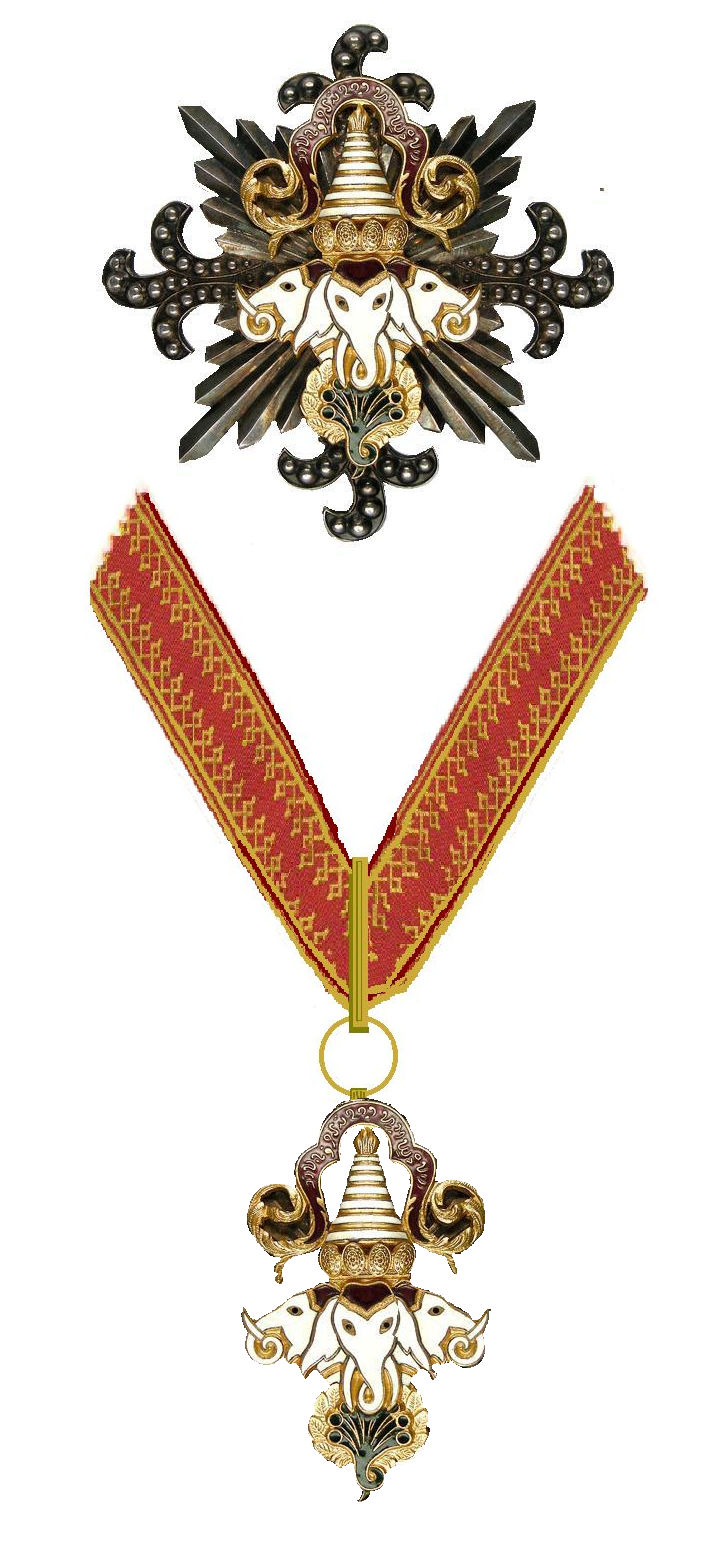
Order of the Million Elephants and the White Parasol ອິສະຣິຍາພອນລ້ານຊ້າງຮົ່ມຂາວ

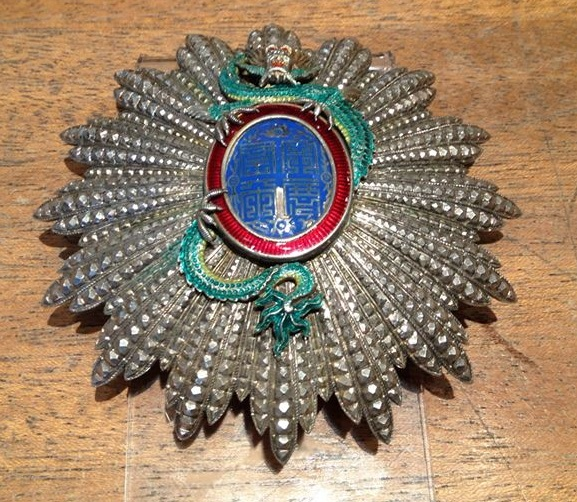
Imperial Order of the Dragon of Annam Đại Nam Long Tinh Viện

=== Museum of Comparative Zoology ===
In 1932 Greenway joined the Museum of Comparative Zoology (MCZ) at Harvard University as Assistant Curator of Birds until 1952 and then, succeeding James Lee Peters, as Curator until 1960. During the 1930s he participated in several collecting expeditions to the Caribbean, especially the Bahamas. In 1936, he and his brother Gilbert flew across the Bahamas from north to south, and were the first to land a plane on East Caicos in the Turks and Caicos Islands; the school children were let out of school for the special occasion. Greenway also took part in Delacour's seventh expedition to Indochina in 1938–1939.

Greenway, who broke from academia and research during his service in WWII, resumed his ornithological work at the MCZ. It was from there that he produced in 1958 his survey of extinct and near-extinct birds, a book that provided a great stimulus to bird conservation over the next few decades. He was also active in the American Committee for International Wildlife Protection and later in the International Council for Bird Preservation (ICBP).

=== American Museum of Natural History ===
In 1960 Greenway left the MCZ for personal reasons, never to return there. Based back at his Greenwich estate, his subsequent ornithological work was carried out in association with the American Museum of Natural History, of which he was a trustee from 1960–61 to 1970–71. In 1962 he became a research associate in the Department of Ornithology there, a position he retained until his death. He began work on a list of the type specimens of birds held by the museum, a massive project not completed at the time of his death. He also instigated, part-financed and participated in a collecting expedition to New Caledonia in 1978, when he was 75 years old.

Relatively few other ornithologists had met him in person because an aversion to large gatherings meant that he probably never attended a single professional meeting or congress in his life. His sometime friend and colleague François Vuilleumier wrote of him:

Shy and retiring he was, but his life and career, or at least what can be traced of them, were at times quite adventuresome. Jim Greenway was so reluctant to leave tracks behind him that, after his death, even his sons did not know important details of their father's academic career.

Jim Greenway was a profoundly eccentric man who was probably unable to tolerate others with a lesser streak of eccentricity than he had. He should be remembered especially as the person who was in charge of the very rich MCZ bird collection for many years, who helped avian conservation get a solid start, who wrote the classic Extinct and Vanishing Birds of the World, who helped publish Peters' Check-list after Peters' death, and who assisted the Department of Ornithology at AMNH in many unrecorded but important ways.

== Publishing and eponyms ==
=== Publications ===
Although Greenway produced numerous scientific papers and collaborated in the preparation of other ornithological publications, the book Greenway is best known for is his 1958 work, Extinct and Vanishing Birds of the World, which had a second edition published in 1967. Greenway had kept a file detailing extinct and at risk birds for years prior to the publication of the book and over several years created a draft book of the book in 1954, but took another four years to create the final version. This book was one of three published by the American Committee for International Wildlife Protection which were the precursors to the IUCN Red List which details species at risk of extinction; along with Francis Harper's Extinct and Vanishing Mammals of the Old World and Glover Morrill Allen's Extinct and Vanishing Mammals of the Western Hemisphere. Today these books are seen as the inspiration behind the IUCN Red List.

=== Eponyms ===
In 1936 Thomas Barbour and Benjamin Shreve named two species of reptiles in Greenway's honor: Leiocephalus greenwayi, a curly-tailed lizard; and Tropidophis greenwayi, a dwarf boa. In 1967 Donn Rosen named a fish, Scolichthys greenwayi, after him.

== Military service ==
During the Second World War Greenway served in the United States Navy. He was commissioned in 1941, becoming a Lieutenant in 1943 and later a Lieutenant Commander, while serving on aircraft carriers in the South West Pacific, in the Solomon Islands and on New Caledonia. Greenway's primary work was with Naval Intelligence spying on the Japanese from islands such as New Caledonia, which inspired some of his later academic work.

== Marriage and children ==
Greenway's first wife was Helen Livingston Scott (1903–1980), the granddaughter of Thomas A. Scott who was a business associate of Greenways grandfather (Lauder) and great-uncle (Carnegie). They had three children: Helen Greenway Steele; H.D.S. Greenway (a noted journalist with both the Boston Globe and Washington Post), and James C. Greenway III.

On December 26, 1959, Greenway's mother, Harriet Lauder Greenway, daughter of George Lauder, died. Within months after his mother's death, Greenway divorced his first wife and ran off to New York with his mistress, Mary Frances Oakes Hunnewell (died April 22, 1989), who herself also had to divorce her spouse in order to marry Greenway.

== The Bird Skinner ==
In 2014, Alice Greenway (a granddaughter from Greenway's first marriage) published a fictionalized account of Greenway's World War II years, in the novel The Bird Skinner (New York: Atlantic Monthly Press). The novel was about "Jim Kennoway" who, like Greenway, was stationed in the Solomon Islands, went on natural history expeditions to far-flung locations, and worked at the American Museum of Natural History. The one key difference is that in the novel, the fictional "Kennoway" mourned "the death of his beautiful wife," who died young. The real Greenway, in contrast, divorced his first wife in order to marry his mistress. The fact that The Bird Skinner is a semi-fictionalized account of the author's grandfather's life — with a sanitized version of his marital life — gives readers a much better appreciation of the book and the author's motivations.
