= Greenway Township, Itasca County, Minnesota =

Greenway Township, Minnesota
- Township
- Greenway Town Hall

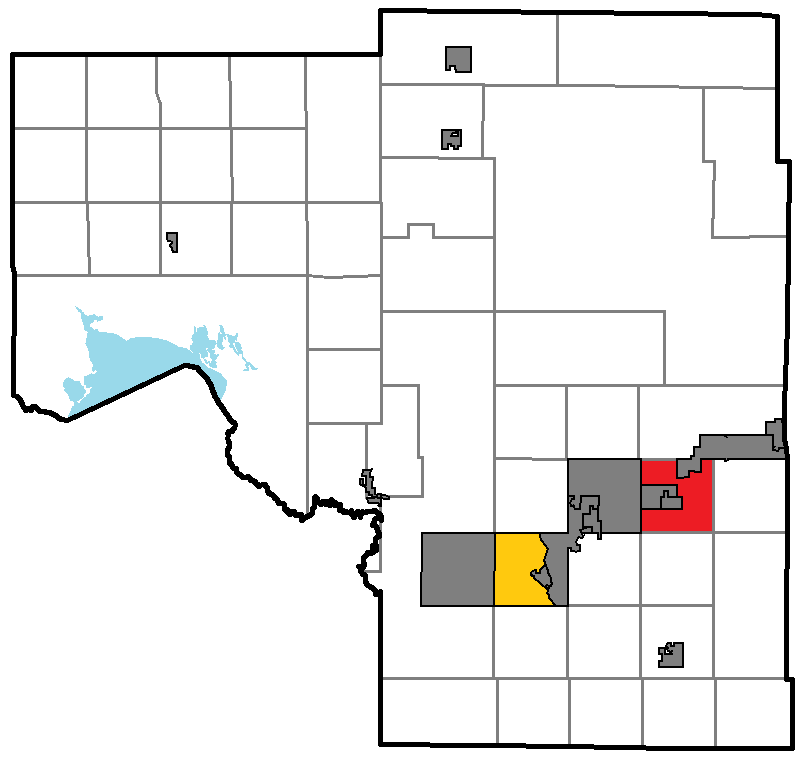
- Location of Greenway Township, within Itasca County, Minnesota
- Coordinates: 47°19′8″N 93°15′32″W
- Country: United States
- State: Minnesota
- County: Itasca

Area
  - Total: 36.1 sq mi (93.4 km^{2})
  - Land: 33.5 sq mi (86.7 km^{2})
  - Water: 2.6 sq mi (6.7 km^{2})
- Elevation: 1,404 ft (428 m)

Population (2020)
  - Total: 1,788
  - Density: 53.4/sq mi (20.6/km^{2})
- Time zone: UTC-6 (Central (CST))
  - Summer (DST): UTC-5 (CDT)
- ZIP code: 55764
- Area code: 218
- FIPS code: 27-25892
- GNIS feature ID: 0664349

Greenway Township is a township in Itasca County, Minnesota, United States. The population was 1,788 at the 2020 census.

Greenway Township was named for John Campbell Greenway, a businessman in the mining industry.

== Geography ==
According to the United States Census Bureau, the township has a total area of 36.1 square miles (93 km^{2}), of which 33.5 square miles (87 km^{2}) is land and 2.6 square miles (6.7 km^{2}), or 7.21%, is water.

== Demographics ==
As of the census of 2000, there were 2,018 people, 845 households, and 568 families residing in the township. The population density was 60.3 inhabitants per square mile (23.3/km^{2}). There were 957 housing units at an average density of 28.6 per square mile (11.0/km^{2}). The racial makeup of the township was 96.53% White, 0.05% African American, 1.34% Native American, 0.15% Asian, 0.05% Pacific Islander, 0.30% from other races, and 1.59% from two or more races. Hispanic or Latino of any race were 0.64% of the population.

There were 845 households, out of which 29.5% had children under the age of 18 living with them, 55.1% were married couples living together, 8.8% had a female householder with no husband present, and 32.7% were non-families. 28.2% of all households were made up of individuals, and 13.7% had someone living alone who was 65 years of age or older. The average household size was 2.38 and the average family size was 2.90.

In the township the population was spread out, with 24.1% under the age of 18, 8.0% from 18 to 24, 25.6% from 25 to 44, 25.0% from 45 to 64, and 17.2% who were 65 years of age or older. The median age was 39 years. For every 100 females, there were 97.5 males. For every 100 females age 18 and over, there were 95.8 males.

The median income for a household in the township was $35,729, and the median income for a family was $45,568. Males had a median income of $35,313 versus $24,125 for females. The per capita income for the township was $18,162. About 8.9% of families and 12.4% of the population were below the poverty line, including 14.2% of those under age 18 and 9.7% of those age 65 or over.
