= Deborah Copenhaver Fellows =

American sculptor

Deborah Copenhaver Fellows (born 1948) is an American sculptor known for her Western themed works. Her best known work is the life-sized statue of former Arizona senator Barry Goldwater included in the National Statuary Hall Collection in the U.S. Capitol in Washington D.C. It was added to the collection as one of Arizona’s two statues in 2015.

== Life ==
Fellows was born and raised on a ranch in northern Idaho. Her father Deb Copenhaver was a champion rodeo rider, winning two world championships in 1955 and 1956 and was inducted into the National Cowboy Hall of Fame in 1991 and the ProRodeo Hall of Fame in 1992. As a teenager Deborah Coperhaver was selected Miss Rodeo Washington. During this time she developed a passion for horses that is frequently reflected in her sculpture.

She attended Fort Wright College of the Holy Names where she first began a serious study of sculpture.

She married Fred Fellows and had a daughter, Fabienne.

Her statue of Bing Crosby was erected just outside the Crosby Student Center, on the Gonzaga University and dedicated on May 3, 1981, Crosby’s birthday.

Fellows won a competition to create the Washington Korean War Memorial, (hers was of a Korean War veteran) and it was dedicated on the Washington State Capitol grounds in Olympia, Washington , on July 24, 1993.

She was inducted into the National Sculpture Society in 2008 and the National Cowgirl Museum and Hall of Fame in 2009.

== Selected works ==
- The Founder, a.k.a. Adolph Coors, Golden, Colorado, 1980
- Bing Crosby, Gonzaga University, Spokane, Washington, 1981
- Inland Northwest Vietnam Veterans Memorial, Dedicated November 10, 1985
- Montana Vietnam Veterans Memorial, Dedicated November 11, 1988
- Tribute to a Cowboy a.k.a. Benny Binion, Las Vegas, Nevada, dedicated November 28, 1988
- Washington Korean War Memorial, Dedicated July 24, 1993
- Lady of the Sea, Cape Sante Marina, Anacortes, Washington 1994
