= H. D. S. Greenway =

American journalist

- Born: May 8, 1935 (age 91); Boston, Massachusetts, U.S.
- Education: Yale University; Oxford University
- Occupations: War correspondent Newspaper editor
- Years active: 1962–present

Hugh David Scott Greenway (born May 8, 1935) is an American journalist who has worked as a foreign affairs correspondent for Time Life, The Washington Post, and The Boston Globe. Greenway has covered conflicts in Vietnam, Laos, Cambodia, Afghanistan, Lebanon, Iraq, Pakistan, Burma, El Salvador, Nicaragua, Bosnia, and Croatia. His writing has also appeared in The New York Times, The New Yorker, The New York Review of Books, The Atlantic, the Columbia Journalism Review, and la Repubblica. Greenway is currently a columnist for Foreign Affairs and a member of the Council on Foreign Relations.

== Early life and education ==
Greenway was born in Boston, Massachusetts, in 1935 to James Greenway and Helen Livingston Scott, the second of three children. His father, a member of the Lauder Greenway family, was a well known ornithologist and explorer who was a curator at Harvard University's Museum of Comparative Zoology. Greenway attended Milton Academy, Yale University and Oxford University. After serving in the U.S. Navy reserve for two years from 1960 to 1962 he began his career in journalism.

Later in his career, Greeenway would be the recipient of both a Nieman Fellowship and a fellowship at the Shorenstein Center on Media, Politics and Public Policy at Harvard University.

== Career ==
Greenway started his career at Time in 1962. Greenway was interviewing W. Averell Harriman at the State Department on November 22, 1963, when reports were received that President President Kennedy had been shot. As the presidential pool were all in Dallas, Greenway was sent to the White House to cover the event there, reporting that "No one around Kennedy thought to call the president's staff. For a moment the White House had become a backwater. Staffers were arguing over whether the White House flag should be lowered."

By the spring of 1967, he became a war correspondent for Time in Indochina covering the Vietnam War in Vietnam, Cambodia, and Laos. "It was Vietnam that obsessed me then," Greenway said. He acquired a reputation for being lucky at first, though that luck ran out in Hue during the Tet Offensive in February 1968 where, embroiled in battle, he actually picked up an M-16 and fired at the enemy. Later in that same battle, Greenway and fellow journalists Charlie Mohr and Al Webb were carrying a wounded Marine to safety and Greenway was hit in the leg by fragments of an RPG. He, Mohr, and Webb were each awarded a Bronze Star for rescuing the Marine and saving his life.

In 1970, Greenway was promoted to chief of war reporting at Time by Henry Luce. Due to the Greenway family's wide-ranging network of friendships, he would find himself on unusual missions, such as escorting his friend John le Carré around Southeast Asia on a research trip for what would become le Carré's book, The Honourable Schoolboy. Greenway was also a friend of photojournalist Sean Flynn, the son of film actor Errol Flynn, and was present when Flynn decided to distribute marijuana to an entire indigenous village in Papua New Guinea. The two men were also together in Cambodia in 1970 the day Flynn and another photojournalist, Dana Stone, rode off—never to be seen again.

In 1972, Greenway left Time to work for The Washington Post in Washington. After some months, the Post named him as its bureau chief in Hong Kong, but he was soon sent to Saigon in early 1973. As the U.S. participation in the war was coming to an end, Greenway found opportunities to travel with fellow correspondents like Frances FitzGerald into the jungles of central Vietnam to interview Viet Cong guerilla leaders. Greenway would later report from Cambodia with Sydney Schanberg at the advent of the Killing Fields of the Khmer Rouge.

He joined The Boston Globe in 1978 and was assigned to build a foreign news service. He went on to create bureaus in London, Tokyo, Canada, Moscow, Latin America, and Jerusalem for the newspaper. At various times he was the foreign and national editor, in charge of the Globe's Washington bureau, and, towards the end, chief of the editorial page. During his tenure there, Greenway covered Anwar Sadat in Jerusalem; the 1982 Lebanon War and elements of the larger Lebanese Civil War; ethnic cleansing and genocide in the Balkans during the Yugoslav Wars; both Gulf Wars and civil wars in Afghanistan and Iraq.

Greenway has been a Bosch Fellow in Public Policy at the American Academy in Berlin and was awarded their Edward Weintal Prize for diplomatic journalism. Greenway currently lives in Massachusetts.

== Bibliography ==
- Greenway, H.D.S (2021). Loaded with Dynamite: Unintended Consequences of Woodrow Wilson's Idealism. TidePool Press. ISBN 978-0997848274.
- Greenway, H.D.S (2014). Foreign Correspondent: A Memoir. Simon and Schuster. ISBN 978-1476761381.
- Buckey, William F. (1989). On the Firing Line: The Public Life of our Public Figures. Random House. ISBN 978-0-39457-568-1. (secondary author)
