= David Greenaway (footballer) =

Scottish footballer

Personal information
- Date of birth: 20 December 1886
- Place of birth: Coatbridge, Scotland
- Date of death: 1946 (aged 59)
- Place of death: London, England
- Height: 5 ft 5 1/2 in (1.66 m)
- Position: Winger

Senior career*
Years	Team	Apps	(Gls)
- Shettleston
1908–1921	(Woolwich) Arsenal	161	(13)
- * Club domestic league appearances and goals

David Greenaway (20 December 1886 – 1946) was a Scottish footballer.

Born in Coatbridge, Lanarkshire, Greenaway played junior football with Shettleston before being signed at the age of 19 by London club Woolwich Arsenal in the summer of 1908. Despite his youth he was immediately propelled into the first team, making his debut against Notts County on 2 September 1908, the first game of the 1908–09 First Division season. He only missed two games that season and went on established himself as a regular fixture on the wing for the following four seasons.

However, after veteran FA Cup-winner Jock Rutherford signed in November 1913 for Arsenal, Greenaway was dropped to make way for him, and he only played 14 league matches in two seasons. World War I then intervened, with all league football cancelled, and Greenaway was called up to fight, serving with the Royal Field Artillery. He returned to Arsenal in 1919 after peacetime led to the resumption of league football, but only played for the first-team three times over the next two seasons. In total he played 170 times for Arsenal, scoring 13 times, before leaving the club in 1921 on a free transfer.
