= George V. Lauder (biologist) =

American biomechanics researcher

- Occupations: Professor of Organismal and Evolutionary Biology at Harvard University

George V. Lauder is a Professor of Organismal and Evolutionary Biology at Harvard University and Fellow of the American Association for the Advancement of Science.

He started his biology degree at Harvard in the early 1970s, graduating in 1976. This was followed with a Master's (1978) and PhD in 1979. Between 1979 and 1981 he worked as a Junior Fellow at the Society of Fellows Harvard University, and then he joined the University of Chicago as a member of faculty. Between 1986 and 1999 he was a faculty member in the Department of Ecology and Evolutionary Biology and Associate Dean of Graduate Studies at the University of California, Irvine. Since 1999 he has been the Alexander Agassiz Professor of Zoology as well as Professor of Organismic and Evolutionary Biology at Harvard University.

His research has focussed on biomechanics, particularly the evolution of fishes undertaking laboratory work on kinematics, muscle function, and hydrodynamics of freely-swimming fishes. Extending and applying this work, he has gone on to analyzing fish locomotive function and the design of fish-like robotic biorobotic platforms.

He is a member of the Lauder-Greenway family.

== DPIV technique ==
In a 2002 article, jointly written with Eliot G. Drucker, Lauder seeks to gain insights into fish locomotion using digital particle image velocimetry (DPIV) techniques. Their motivation is that despite many advances in our understanding of mechanics of animal propulsion, the relationship between the activity of the animal and fluid movement was little understood. Digital particle image velocimetry (DPIV) has provided them with a key experimental tool to allow significant new insights into animal propulsion in fluids.
