= Carnegie Steel Company =

19th-century steel production company in Pennsylvania, US

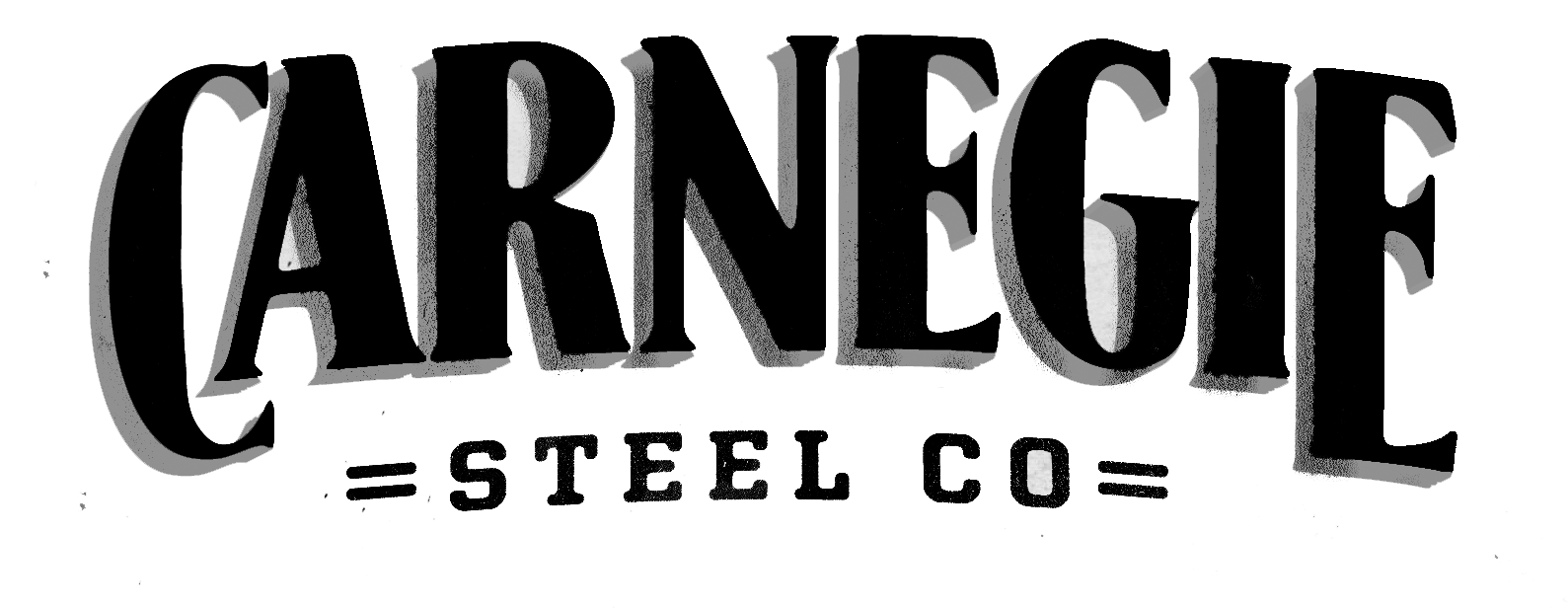
- Type: Partnership
- Industry: Steel, coke, railroad
- Founded: July 1, 1892; 134 years ago
- Founders: Andrew Carnegie; Henry Clay Frick; George Lauder; Henry Phipps Jr.
- Defunct: March 2, 1901; 125 years ago
- Successor: U.S. Steel
- Headquarters: Pittsburgh, Pennsylvania
- Products: Steel; coal; coke; flat-rolled and tubular steel products; railroad rails
- Services: Manufacturing

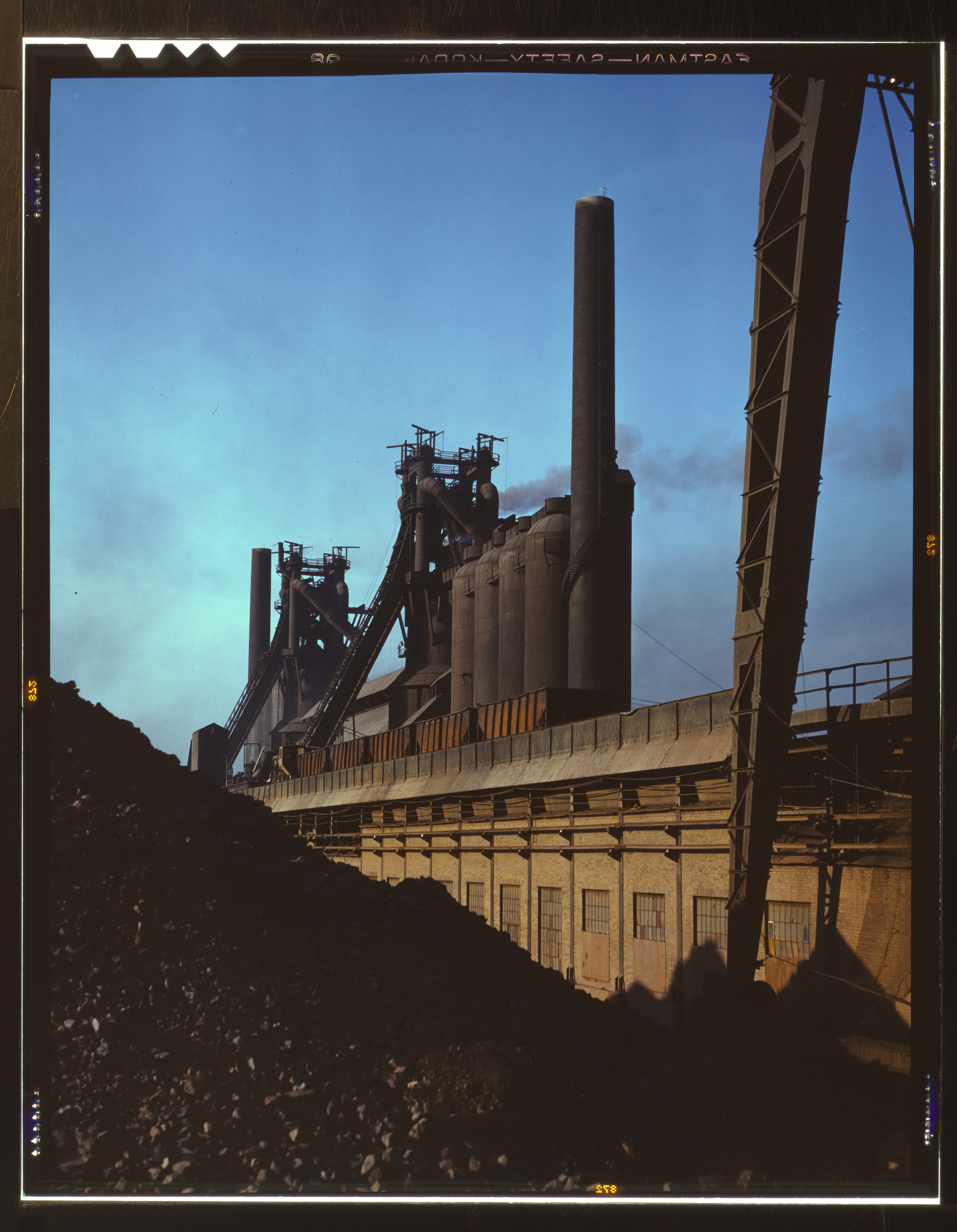
Blast furnaces and iron ore at the Carnegie-Illinois Steel Corporation mills in 1941

The Carnegie Steel Company was a steel-producing company primarily created by Andrew Carnegie and several close associates to manage businesses at steel mills in the Pittsburgh, Pennsylvania, area in the late 19th century. The company was formed in 1892, and was subsequently sold in 1901 in one of the largest business transactions of the early 20th century, to become a major component of U.S. Steel. The sale made Carnegie one of the richest Americans in history.

== Creation ==
Carnegie began the construction of his first steel mill, the Edgar Thomson Steel Works, in 1872 at Braddock, Pennsylvania. The Thomson Steel Works began producing rails in 1874. By a combination of low wages, efficient technology, infrastructure investment and an efficient organization, the mill produced cheap steel, which sold for a large profit in the growing markets of industrial development. Carnegie alone estimated that 40% was returned on the investment, i.e., a profit of $40,000 from a $100,000 investment in the mill.

The profits made by the Edgar Thomson Steel Works were substantial enough to let Carnegie and his partners, including Henry Clay Frick, his cousin George Lauder, and Henry Phipps Jr., buy other nearby steel mills. These included the Homestead Steel Works, which Carnegie acquired in 1883. The presence of the Allegheny, Monongahela, and Ohio rivers provided transport for the heavy materials used in steel production. Each plant was near to or alongside a river.

Carnegie agreed to Frick's subsequent proposal that the various plants and assets, including H. C. Frick & Company, be consolidated into a single company. This consolidation occurred on July 1, 1892, with the formation of the Carnegie Steel Company.

== Operations ==
The company headquarters were located in the Carnegie Building, an early skyscraper in Downtown Pittsburgh. Built to show its use of steel in its construction, the building was fifteen stories high and was left uncovered for a full year. The Carnegie Building was demolished in 1952.

Carnegie Steel made major technological innovations in the 1880s, especially the installation of the open hearth furnace system at Homestead in 1886. It now became possible to make steel suitable for structural beams and, with the advanced work of George Lauder in arms and armament, for armor plate for the US Navy and the militaries of other governments, which paid far higher prices for the premium product. In addition, the plant moved increasingly toward the continuous system of production. Carnegie installed vastly improved systems of material-handling, like overhead cranes, hoists, charging machines, and buggies. All of this greatly sped the process of steelmaking and allowed the production of far vaster quantities of steel. As the mills expanded, the labor force grew rapidly, especially less skilled workers. The more skilled union members reacted with the unsuccessful 1892 Homestead Strike along with demands for reduced working hours and against pay cuts. After the unsuccessful strike the company continued to expand and profits grew year on year, with the company having earned net profits of $21 million in 1899.

J&L Steel was the most important competitor to the Carnegie Steel Company (and later to U.S. Steel) in the vicinity of Pittsburgh.

Carnegie Operations
Name	Location	Rail Service	Type of Facility
Carnegie Carrie Furnaces	Rankin	Union RR	Steel Mill – 5 Blast furnace stacks
Clark works	Pittsburgh	Allegheny Valley	Hoops, bands, light rails
Donora works	Donora	Pgh, Virginia & Charleston	Steel Mill – 2 Blast furnace stacks
Duquesne works	Cochran	Union RR	Steel Mill – 4 Blast furnace stacks
Edgar Thomson works	Braddock	Union RR	Steel Mill – 11 Blast furnace stacks
Homestead works	Munhall	Union RR	Steel Mill
Howard axle works	Howard	Union RR	Forge
Isabella furnaces	Etna	West Penn	Steel Mill – 3 Blast furnace stacks
Lower Union Mills	Pittsburgh	Allegheny Valley	Iron Mill
Lucy furnaces	Pittsburgh	Allegheny Valley	Steel Mill – 2 Blast furnace stacks
Monessen works	Monessen	Pittsburgh and Lake Erie	Rolling Mill and Steel works
McCutcheon works	Allegheny	Pittsburgh and Western	Hoops, bands, light rails
Painter works	South Side	Pittsburgh and Lake Erie	Processing
Upper Union mills	Pittsburgh	Allegheny Valley	Iron Mill
Galvanizing plant	South Side	Pittsburgh and Lake Erie	Processing

== Sale ==
The Carnegie Steel Company was sold in 1901 to U.S. Steel, a newly formed organization set up by J. P. Morgan. It sold at roughly $492 million ($19 billion+ today), of which $226 million ($8.7 billion+ today) went to Carnegie himself. U.S. Steel was a conglomerate with subsidiary companies. This subsidiary company continued to use the same name, the Carnegie Steel Company, for the next 35 years after the 1901 amalgamation. In 1936 it was changed to the Carnegie-Illinois Steel Company, incorporating the name of the former Illinois Steel Company.

== See also ==
- History of the steel industry (1850–1970)
- Illinois Steel Company
