= Fulton =

Fulton may refer to:

== People ==
- Robert Fulton (1765–1815), American engineer and inventor who developed the first commercially successful steam-powered ship
- Fulton (surname)

=== Given name ===
- Fulton Allem (born 1957), South African golfer
- Fulton Burley (1922–2007), Irish-Canadian performer
- Fulton J. Redman (1885–1969), American politician and newspaper editor
- Fulton J. Sheen (1895–1979), American Roman Catholic archbishop and televangelist
- Fulton Kuykendall (1953–2024), American former footballer
- Fulton Lewis Jr. (1903–1966), American radio broadcaster
- Fulton MacGregor (born 1980), Scottish politician
- Fulton Mackay (1922–1987), Scottish comic actor and playwright
- Fulton McGrath (1907–1958), American jazz pianist and songwriter
- Fulton Oursler (1893–1952), American journalist and editor

== Places ==
=== Canada ===
- Fulton, Ontario, a community in West Lincoln, Ontario

=== United States ===
- Fulton, Alabama
- Fulton, Arkansas
- Fulton, California
- Fulton, Illinois
- Fulton, Indiana
- Fulton, Kansas
- Fulton, Kentucky
- Fulton, Maryland
- Fulton, Michigan (disambiguation)
- Fulton, Minneapolis, Minnesota
- Fulton, Mississippi
- Fulton, Missouri
- Fulton, New York (disambiguation),
- Fulton, Ohio
- Fulton, South Dakota
- Fulton, Texas
  - George W. Fulton Mansion
- Fulton, Tennessee
- Fulton, Wisconsin, a town
- Fulton (community), Wisconsin, an unincorporated community

== Ships ==
For naval and merchant ships see Fulton (ship)

== Other uses ==
- Fulton Beer, an American microbrewery
- Fulton Financial Corporation, an American financial holding company
- Fulton gap, a discovery in 2017 that it is uncommon for planets to have a size between 1.5 and 2 times that of Earth
- Fulton Gearloose, a Disney character, father of Gyro Gearloose
- Fulton Homes, an American home builder based in Tempe, Arizona
- Fulton Opera House, a venue in Lancaster, Pennsylvania, United States
- Fulton surface-to-air recovery system
- Fulton Umbrellas, a manufacturer of umbrellas in the United Kingdom

== See also ==
- Fulton County (disambiguation)
- Fulton Ferry (disambiguation)
- Fulton Township (disambiguation)
- Lord Fulton's committee report, a major review of the UK civil service
