= USS Fulton =

Five ships of the United States Navy have borne the name USS Fulton, in honor of Robert Fulton.

- United States floating battery Demologos, later Fulton, a catamaran steam frigate, launched in 1815, delivered to the Navy in 1816 and used as a receiving ship until she exploded in 1829
- USS Fulton (1837), a sidewheel steamer launched in 1837, captured by the Confederates in 1861 and destroyed in the evacuation of Pensacola in 1862
- USS Fulton (AS-1), a submarine tender launched in 1914, reclassified as a gunboat (PG-49) in 1930, and decommissioned in 1934
- USS Fulton (SP-247), a tugboat, converted into a patrol vessel in commission from 1917 to 1919
- USS Fulton (AS-11), a Fulton-class submarine tender, launched in 1940 and struck in 1991

== See also ==
- USS Dick Fulton (1862), a sternwheel steamer in service as a tender with the United States Army′s Ram Fleet from 1862 to ca. 1864
- Fulton (ship), for other ships of this name
