= List of ships named Fulton =

Several ships have been named Fulton, at least some after the American pioneer of steam-powered water transport Robert Fulton.

Five ships of the United States Navy have borne the name USS Fulton:

- United States floating battery Demologos, later Fulton, a catamaran steam frigate, launched in 1815, delivered to the Navy in 1816 and used as a receiving ship until she exploded in 1829
- USS Fulton (1837), a sidewheel steamer launched in 1837, captured by the Confederates in 1861 and destroyed in the evacuation of Pensacola in 1862
- USS Fulton (AS-1), a submarine tender launched in 1914, reclassified as a gunboat (PG-49) in 1930, and decommissioned in 1934
- USS Fulton (SP-247), a tugboat, converted into a patrol vessel and in commission from 1917 to 1919
- USS Fulton (AS-11), a Fulton-class submarine tender, launched in 1940 and struck in 1991

== Other ships ==
- French corvette Fulton, launched in 1833 and served until 1867
- SS Fulton (1855), a steamer chartered by the Union Army during the American Civil War
- Tugboat Fulton, built in 1909 for the Delaware, Lackawanna and Western Railroad Co, and served as USS Fulton (SP-247) in World War I
- Fulton (1911), launched in 1911, built by A. C. Brown & Son, Tottenville, New York for NY & NJ SS Co.
- French submarine Fulton, launched in 1919 and served until 1935
- Russian submarine Som, originally named Fulton, launched in 1904 and the prototype for Som-class submarines

== See also ==
- USS Dick Fulton (1862), a sternwheel steamer in service as a tender with the United States Army's Ram Fleet from 1862 to ca. 1864
- Robert Fulton (1909), a New York excursion vessel built in 1909 for Hudson River Day Line and finally scrapped in 1968
- Robert Fulton, a Liberty ship built in 1942
