= Fulton Park (Brooklyn) =

Public park in Brooklyn, New York

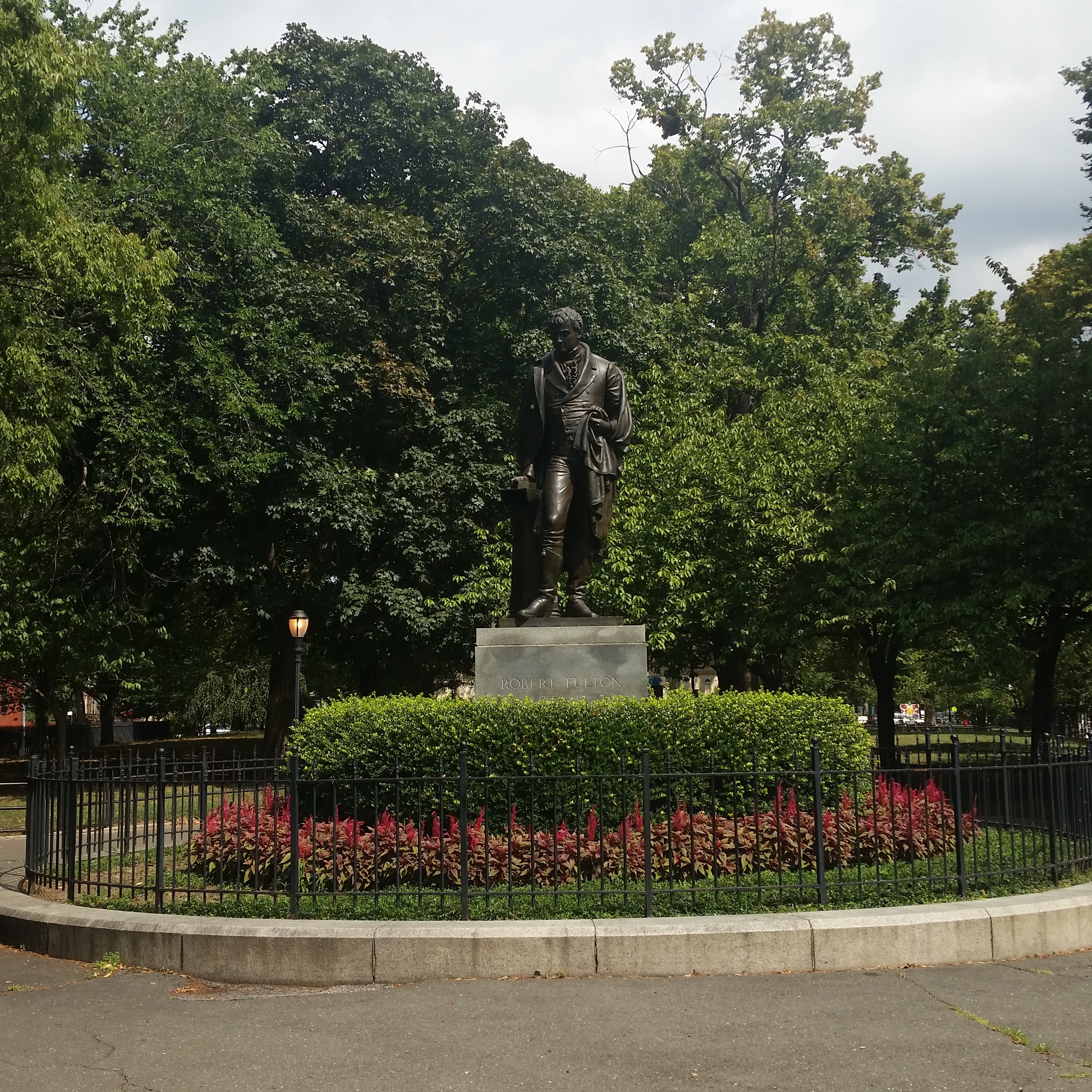

- Location within New York City
- Location: Brooklyn, New York, United States
- Coordinates: 40°40′47″N 73°55′58″W

Fulton Park is a park in Bedford-Stuyvesant, Brooklyn, New York City. It is named after Robert Fulton, who is best known for launching the first commercially successful steamboat. The site on Chauncey Street was acquired by the City in 1904 for just over $300,000 (equivalent to $10,750,000 in 2025).
