= Fulton Beer =

Coordinates: 44.984907°N 93.278789°W

- Company type: Private
- Industry: Alcoholic beverage
- Founded: 2009
- Headquarters: Minneapolis, Minnesota, United States
- Products: Beer
- Website: fultonbeer.com

Fulton Beer is a microbrewery based in the North Loop area of Minneapolis in the U.S. state of Minnesota. The company was founded in 2009 by Ryan Petz, Jim Diley, Brian Hoffman and Peter Grande, who had been homebrewing for several years out of a garage in the Fulton neighborhood of Minneapolis. The company has also said that early 19th century American engineer and inventor Robert Fulton was the inspiration for the namesake of the brand.

== History ==
Fulton's signature beer, Sweet Child of Vine IPA, was initially contract brewed at the Sand Creek Brewing Company in Black River Falls, Wisconsin. However, an important distinction in the contract with Sand Creek enabled Fulton to brew on Sand Creek equipment so Fulton could assert that they brewed Fulton beer. In September 2010 the company signed a lease for a former sewing factory located near Downtown Minneapolis to build their own production building. Their brewery formally opened in November 2011 offering tours and growlers. In March 2012 Fulton opened a taproom at their brewery, making them the first brewery in Minneapolis to do so under a revised law.

In September 2013, Fulton announced plans to lease a new 51,000 square foot industrial space in Northeast Minneapolis to use as a production space. Brewing began at their new facility in August 2014 with most of their product brewed and packaged at the new facility. The company had the intention to surpass 25,000 barrels by 2015.
