= USS Fulton (AS-1) =

Gunboat of the United States Navy

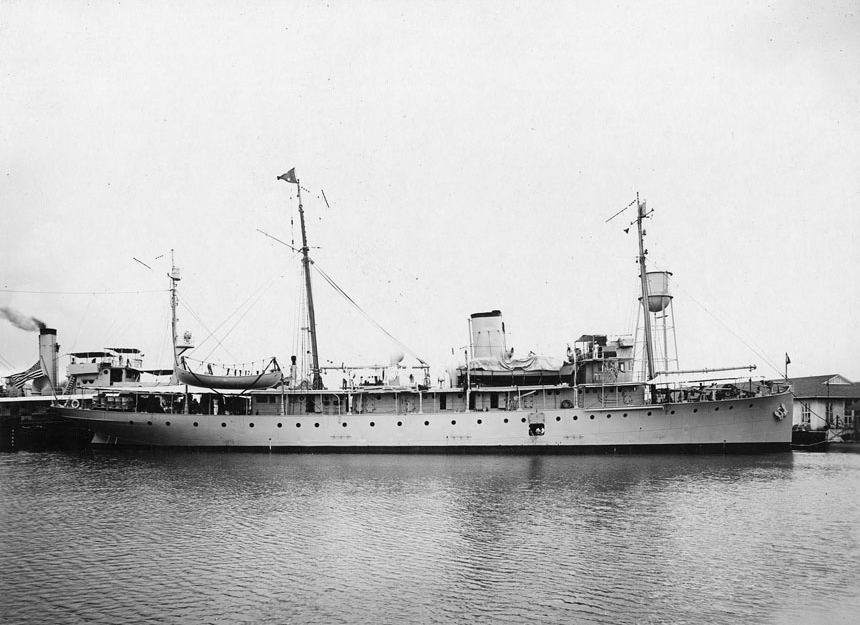
- USS Fulton (AS-1) in 1924

History

United States
- Name: USS Fulton
- Namesake: Robert Fulton (1765–1815), American inventor and engineer widely credited with developing the first commercially successful steamboat
- Ordered: 4 March 1911
- Builder: Fore River Shipyard
- Laid down: 2 October 1913
- Launched: 6 June 1914
- Sponsored by: Mrs. A. T. Sutcliffe
- Commissioned: 7 December 1914
- Decommissioned: 5 October 1925
- Recommissioned: 2 September 1930
- Reclassified: Gunboat, PG-49, 29 September 1930
- Decommissioned: 12 May 1934
- Stricken: 1934
- Fate: Scrapped 1934

General characteristics
- Type: Submarine tender
- Displacement: 1,308 long tons (1,329 t)
- Length: 226 ft 6 in (69.04 m)
- Beam: 35 ft (11 m)
- Draft: 13 ft (4.0 m)
- Installed power: 1,100 bhp (820 kW)
- Propulsion: 1 × 6-cylinder, 2-cycle, NELSECO diesel engine
- Speed: 12.34 kn (14.20 mph; 22.85 km/h)
- Complement: 6 officers and 129 enlisted
- Armament: 2 × 3 in (76 mm)/50 cal guns, 1 × 1-pounder automatic anti-aircraft gun

USS Fulton (AS-1) was constructed as a submarine tender in 1914, but later was converted into a gunboat and redesignated PG-49.

Fulton should not be confused with USS Fulton (SP-247), a patrol vessel that operated from 1917 to 1919 while Fulton (AS-1) was in commission.

== Construction and commissioning ==
Fulton was originally planned to be named Niagara, 30 April 1912 and was renamed Fulton, 10 February 1913. Fulton was launched on 6 June 1914 by New London Ship and Engine Company, Groton, Connecticut. The ship was sponsored by Mrs. A. T. Sutcliffe, great-granddaughter of Robert Fulton, for whom the ship is named. Fulton was commissioned on 7 December 1914.

== Submarine tender ==
During her first six months of service, Fulton tended submarines at Norfolk, Charleston, New York, and Newport, then after overhaul, arrived at New London on 2 November 1915, where in 1918 she was the base ship for the newly formed Submarine School. Through 1922, this was to be her principal base for operations with submarines along the east coast and in the Caribbean from Cape Cod to Cuba. She took part in maneuvers and war games, served as station ship at New London, and in the summer of 1922 was flagship of Commander, Atlantic Submarine Flotillas. Reassigned as tender for the Submarine Base at Coco Solo, Canal Zone, Fulton arrived there on 4 April 1923, and during the following year joined in exercises on both sides of the Panama Canal Zone as well as making a survey of Almirante Bay, Panama. She returned to Philadelphia on 14 July 1925, and there was decommissioned and placed in reserve on 5 October.

== Gunboat ==
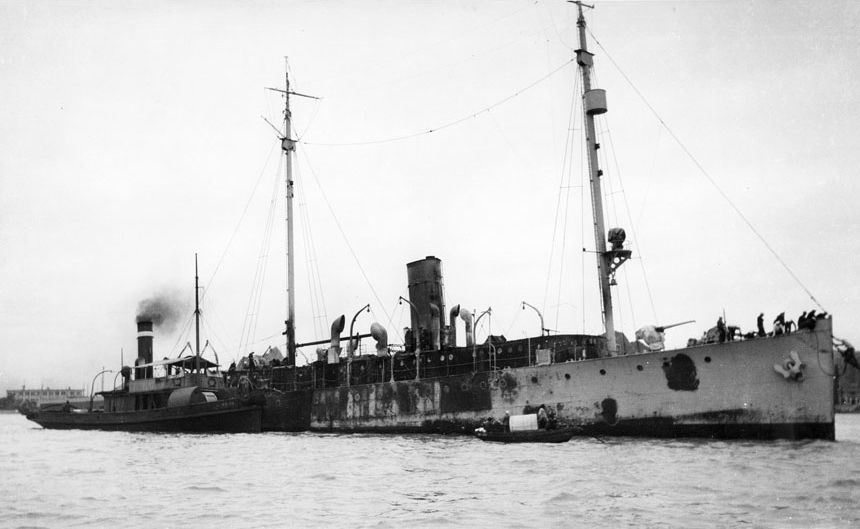
USS Fulton (PG-49) in March 1934 after her fire at sea.

Fulton was recommissioned on 2 September 1930 for duty as a survey ship in the Panama Canal Zone, reclassified as a gunboat, PG-49, on 29 September. On 3 March 1931, she returned to Balboa. Aside from a voyage north for overhaul in the winter of 1931–32, she conducted surveys in the Canal Zone area until arriving at San Diego on 13 August 1932 to prepare for duty in the Asiatic Fleet.

Her assigned station was Hong Kong, where she arrived on 3 November. With infrequent voyages to Cavite Navy Yard in the Philippines, Fulton patrolled the south China coast from Hong Kong to Canton until 14 March 1934. On that day, a fire broke out amidships when exhaust lines from two cylinders of a diesel engine carried away and ignited oil on the engine. The crew assembled on the bow and stern, and were taken off by the British destroyer HMS Wishart and the merchant ship SS Tsinan, three of the men having minor injuries, and brought to the Royal Navy Dockyard at Hong Kong. The British destroyer HMS Whitshed stood by the burning ship until a salvage party got the fire under sufficient control to allow her to be taken in tow for Junk Bay in Hong Kong. On 24 March, an American tug came to tow Fulton into Hong Kong, where she received emergency repairs to allow her to be towed to Cavite.

The United States Department of the Navy later passed thanks to British naval authorities for the assistance Wishart and Whitshed provided to Fulton and her crew.

== Decommissioning and disposal ==
Fulton was decommissioned at Cavite on 12 May 1934. She was scrapped later that year.

== See also ==
- USS Fulton, for other ships with a similar name
- Fulton-class submarine tender for a class of submarine tenders named for USS Fulton (AS-11)
