= Howard Roberts (sculptor) =

American sculptor (1843–1900)

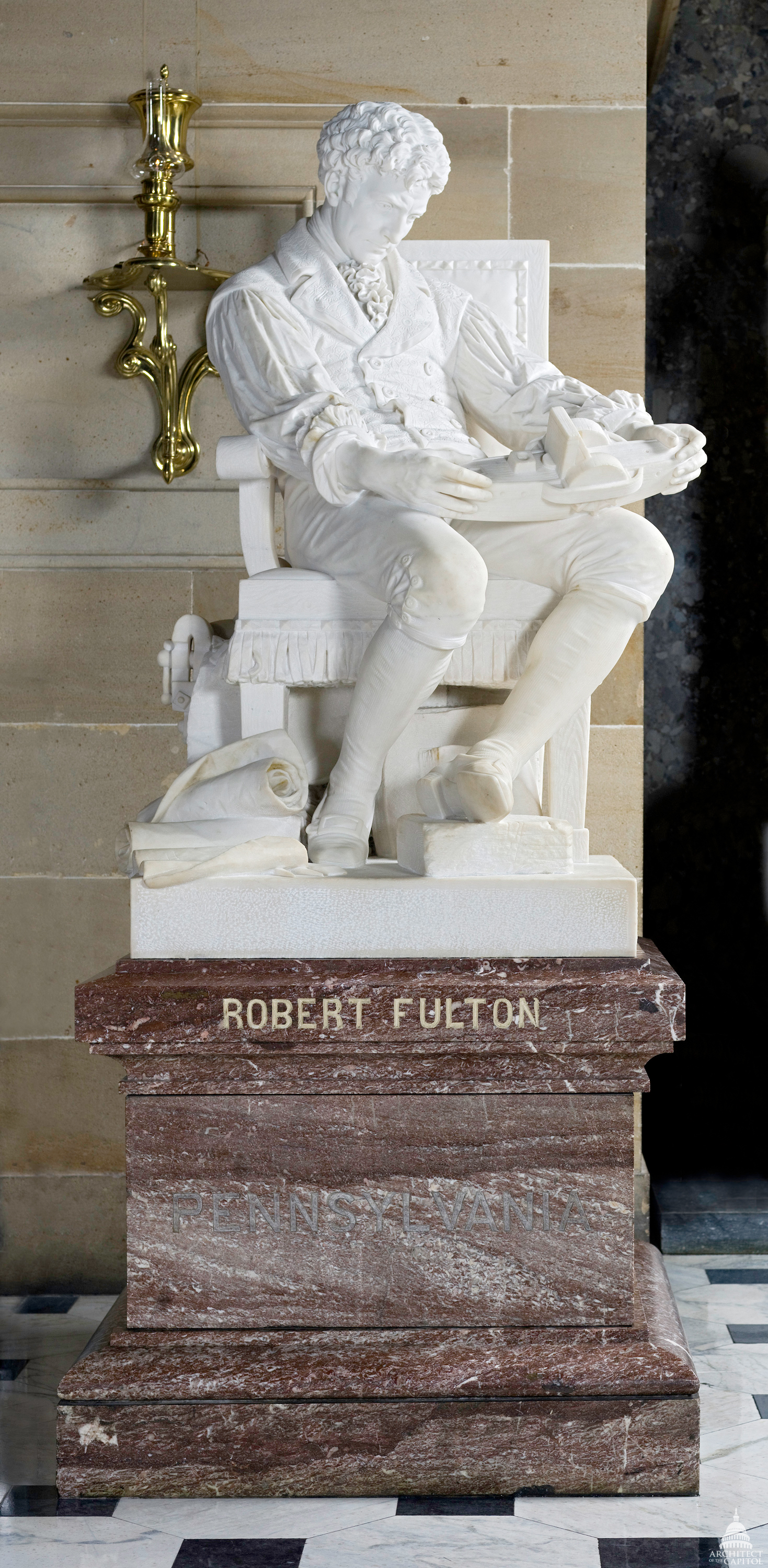
Robert Fulton (1878-83) by Howard Roberts, Statuary Hall Collection, U.S. Capitol

Howard Roberts (April 8, 1843 – April 19, 1900) was an American sculptor, who spent most of his life and career in Philadelphia, Pennsylvania. At the time of the 1876 Centennial Exposition, he was "considered the most accomplished American sculptor," but his output was small, and his reputation was soon surpassed by Augustus Saint-Gaudens and others.

Examples of his work are in the collections of the U.S. Capitol, the Philadelphia Museum of Art, the Pennsylvania Academy of the Fine Arts, the Library Company of Philadelphia, and the New York Historical Society.

== Biography ==
Born into a well-to-do Old Philadelphia family, Roberts studied at the Pennsylvania Academy of the Fine Arts under sculptor Joseph A. Bailly. He was an exact contemporary of fellow Philadelphia artist Thomas Eakins, and both entered the École nationale supérieure des Beaux-Arts in Paris in 1866, and studied under sculptor Augustin-Alexandre Dumont. Eakins did not consider Roberts a friend, calling him "a rich disagreeable young man from Philadelphia, one who has without any apparent reason seen fit to be my enemy." Still, Roberts may have posed for Eakins, and Roberts brokered a reconciliation between Eakins and Mary Cassatt. Roberts continued his studies under sculptor Charles Gumery, before returning to Philadelphia in 1869.

Architect Frank Furness, whose firm won the 1871 design competition for PAFA's new building, sought advice from the two wonder boys from Paris, Roberts and Eakins, when designing its painting and sculpture studios.

=== Early works ===
Roberts's first major work was a two-thirds-life-size marble group, Hester Prynne and Baby Pearl at the Pillory (1869–72), inspired by Nathaniel Hawthorne's novel The Scarlet Letter. It was exhibited at the Pennsylvania Academy of the Fine Arts in 1872. Roberts returned to Paris in 1873, taking with him the plaster of Hypathia (heroine of Charles Kingsley's novel of the same name) to be cut in marble.

=== La Première Pose ===
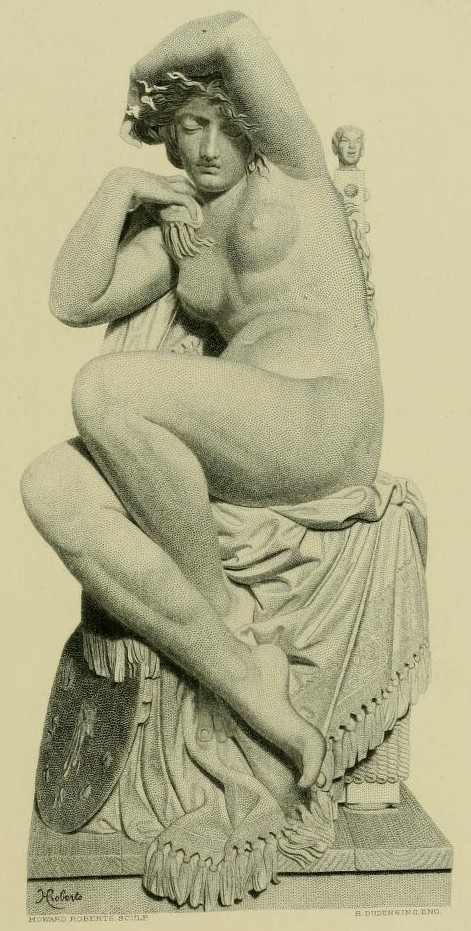
La Première Pose by Howard Roberts (1876), Philadelphia Museum of Art. Steel engraving by Richard Dudensing (1876)

Roberts began a new sculpture in Paris, La Première Pose (1873–76), likely as a replacement for Hypathia as his display piece for the upcoming 1876 Centennial Exhibition. He modeled the new work in clay over some 18 months, and cast it in plaster in France. Roberts chose Alfred Stauch, a German stonecutter who he knew from Philadelphia, to cut it in marble. In 1875, Roberts left the plaster of La Première Pose with Stauch in Germany, and brought the plaster of Hypathia back to Philadelphia. According to a contemporaneous newspaper article, Hypathia was cut in marble in Philadelphia in 1877 "by a German," whom art historian David Sellin conjectured was Stauch.

La Première Pose was exhibited at the 1876 Centennial Exposition in Philadelphia, although the sculpture arrived by ship at the city's ports about a week after the fair's May 10 opening. Days later, a New York Herald correspondent reported that Roberts was making finishing touches on it in his Philadelphia studio. Roberts was awarded a gold medal for La Première Pose, one of only three received by American sculptors. As the critic William J. Clark described it:

In the United States Department there was no piece of sculpture which was marked by such high technical qualities as the Première Pose of Howard Roberts—a work which was almost as much a product of the schools of Paris as the admirable performances exhibited in the French Department. ... The subject is a young woman preparing to pose undraped, for the first time, in a painter's studio, and the sculptor has indicated his own appreciation of the fact that the situation has both a comic and a tragic side, by the grotesque comic and tragic masks which he has added as decorations to the uprights of the back of the chair. ... This figure, however, is such an absolute triumph over a great number of technical difficulties that it is particularly well worthy of consideration for its technical qualities alone. ... The workmanship, however, is so fine throughout that it would be an almost endless task to attempt a detailed analysis of it.

=== Robert Fulton ===
Roberts helped to turn American tastes away from Italianate Neo-Classicism to French Beaux-Arts realism. In an 1877-78 national design competition among thirty American sculptors for a statue to represent Pennsylvania in the U.S. Capitol, Roberts was the unanimous choice of the judges. Rather than creating a traditional heroic work, he modeled a young Robert Fulton dressed in casual clothes, deep in thought, contemplating the possibilities of the steamboat model he holds in his lap:

—A statue of Robert Fulton has been finished in the clay by Howard Roberts. Fulton is dressed as a working man, and is intent on a small model held in the right hand, the forearm being bare. About his chair are tools. The model has been accepted by the Legislature.

This exactly paralleled what Thomas Eakins was doing in his paintings of William Rush and His Model — depicting the artistic/intellectual process of the sculptor/inventor that culminated in his success, rather than just celebrating the great man.

Art historian David Sellin conjectured that Roberts likely sent Alfred Stauch to Italy to pick out the Carrara marble for Robert Fulton. Stauch returned to Philadelphia, and roughed out the piece in marble "in the Chestnut Street studio under the daily supervision of the artist. Roberts himself put on the finishing touches and cut the face." Robert Fulton was installed in Statuary Hall at the U.S. Capitol, where it was unveiled on February 26, 1883.

=== Personal ===
On June 1, 1876, Roberts married Helen Pauline Davis Lewis (1853–1938). They had two children:

- Howard Radclyffe Roberts (1877–1924), became a prominent ornithologist, and was the father of entomologist Howard Radclyffe Roberts Jr.
- Helen Pauline Roberts (1880–1889), died young.

Roberts closed his Philadelphia studio in 1894, and returned to Paris with his wife and son. He unexpectedly died there at age 57 in 1900. A memorial exhibition of his work was held at the Pennsylvania Academy of the Fine Arts in 1905.

Howard Roberts (1845-1900) exhibited a figure called La Première Pose at the Centennial Exposition in 1876, which aroused great interest, as it was the first notable example of the modern French style in American sculpture. A few ideal busts and statues or statuettes, Hester Prynne, Hypathia, Lot's Wife, Eleanor, make up nearly the sum of Roberts' works, but he has the honor of having introduced the French style.

== Selected works ==
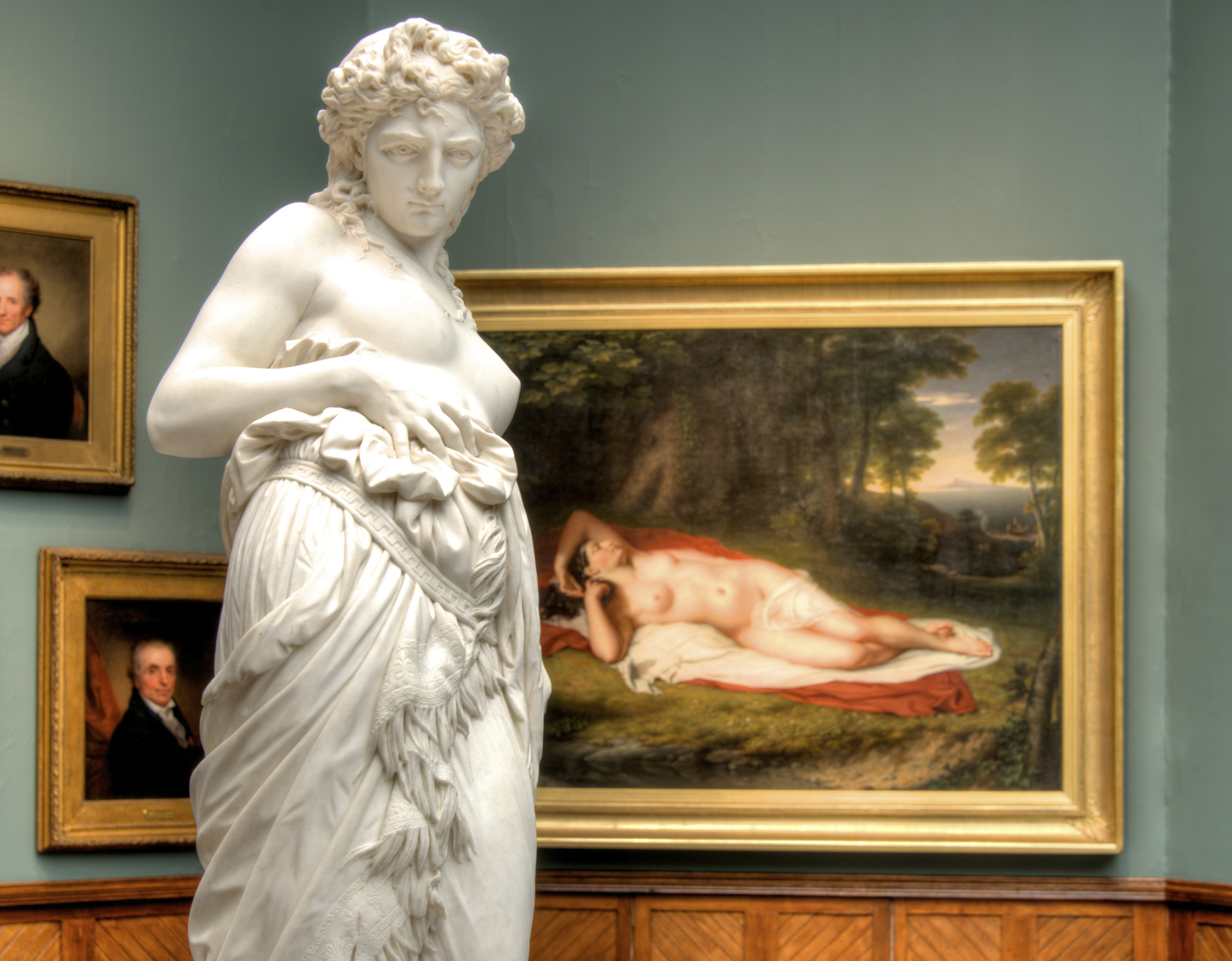
Hypathia Attacked by the Monks (1873-77), Pennsylvania Academy of the Fine Arts

- Eleanore (1870), bust, marble, Pennsylvania Academy of the Fine Arts, Philadelphia, Pennsylvania
- Hester Prynne and Baby Pearl at the Pillory (1869–72), statuette, marble, Library Company of Philadelphia
- Lucile (c.1871), head and torso, location unknown
- Hypathia Attacked by the Monks (1873–77), statue, marble, Pennsylvania Academy of the Fine Arts, Philadelphia, Pennsylvania
- La Première Pose (1873–76), statue, marble, Philadelphia Museum of Art
- Lot's Wife (1876–77), statue, marble, private collection
- Napoleon's First Battle (1878–79), bas-relief?, location unknown. Depicts Napoleon as a boy surveying his toy soldiers.
- Robert Fulton (1878–83), statue, marble, National Statuary Hall, U.S. Capitol, Washington, D.C.
  - Maquette for Robert Fulton, plaster, New York Historical Society
