= Statue of Robert Fulton =

Statue in the United States Capitol

Robert Fulton
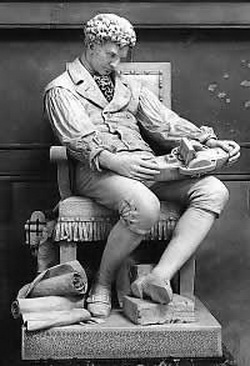
- Artist: Howard Roberts
- Medium: Marble sculpture
- Subject: Robert Fulton
- Location: Washington, D.C., United States

Robert Fulton is a marble sculpture depicting the American engineer and inventor of the same name by Howard Roberts, installed at the United States Capitol's National Statuary Hall, in Washington, D.C., as part of the National Statuary Hall Collection. The statue was gifted by the U.S. state of Pennsylvania in 1889.

== See also ==
- 1889 in art
