= Fulton Ferry =

Fulton Ferry may refer to:

- Fulton Ferry (ferry), a former ferry connecting Manhattan's and Brooklyn's Fulton Streets
  - Fulton Ferry Company, which operated the Fulton Ferry
- Fulton Ferry, Brooklyn, the neighborhood around the former ferry landing
  - Fulton Slip, Brooklyn, the Ferry slip in Fulton Ferry, Brooklyn, the docking facility of the Fulton Ferry
  - Fulton Slip, Manhattan, the former ferry landing in Manhattan, now part of the South Street Seaport
- Empire-Fulton Ferry State Park, another name for Brooklyn Bridge Park on the Brooklyn side
- Fulton Ferry (BMT Fulton Street Line), a station on the demolished BMT Fulton Street Line in Brooklyn that closed in 1940

== See also ==
- Fulton Street (Manhattan)
- Fulton Street (Brooklyn)
- Bleecker Street Line, originally the Bleecker Street and Fulton Ferry Railroad, chartered 1864, the last horse car line in New York City, not replaced with a trolley line or bus route when it was abandoned in 1917
- Robert Fulton (1765–1815), an American engineer and inventor widely credited with developing a commercially successful steamboat, after whom the ferry was named
