= Nautilus (1800 submarine) =

French submarine, first practical submersible vessel

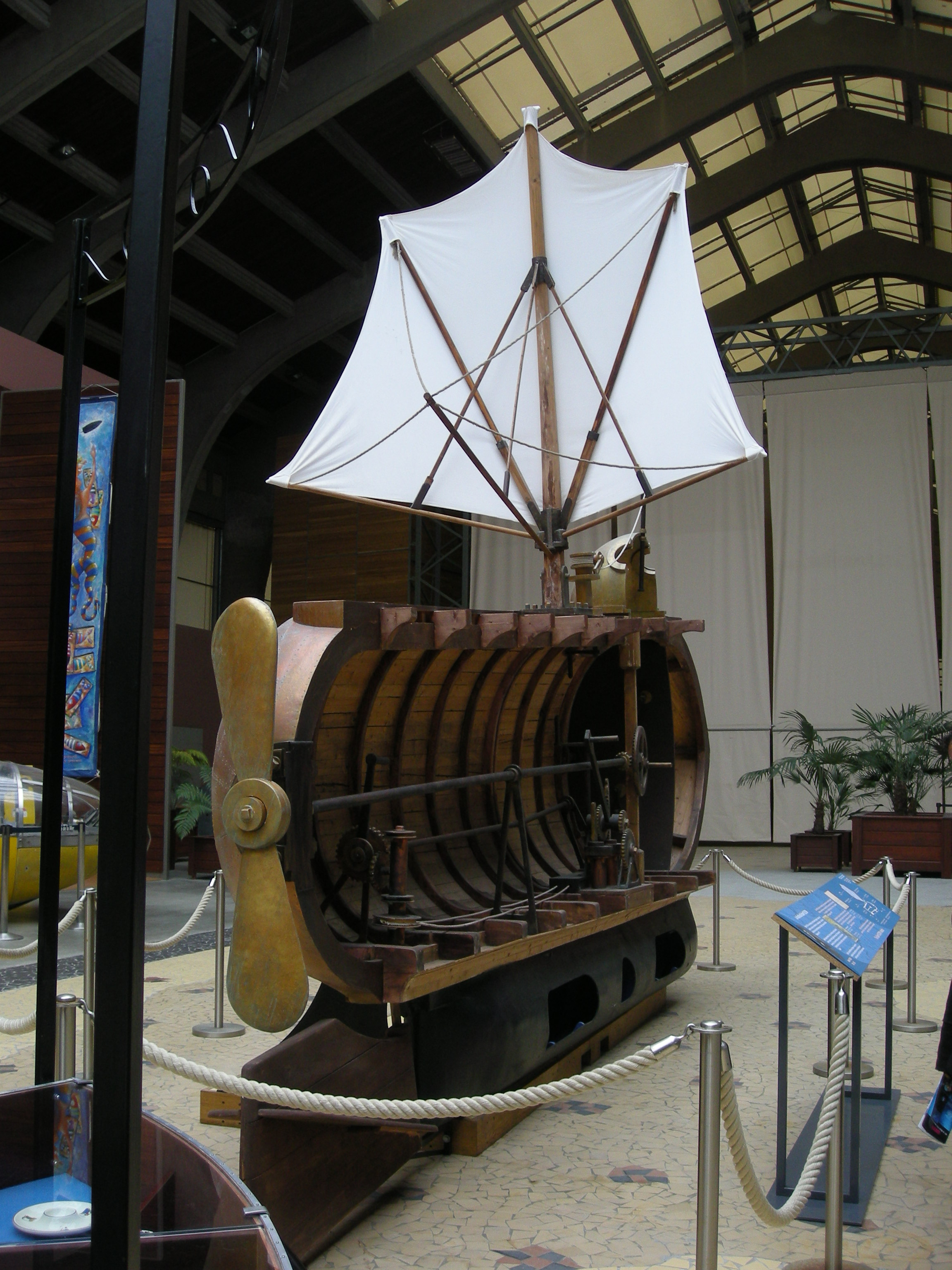
- Full-sized section model at Cité de la Mer, Cherbourg, France

History
- Name: Nautilus
- Laid down: Perrier boatyard in Rouen

General characteristics
- Length: 21 ft 3 in (6.48 m)
- Beam: 6 ft 4 in (1.93 m)
- Propulsion: Hand-cranked screw propeller or Sail (when surfaced)

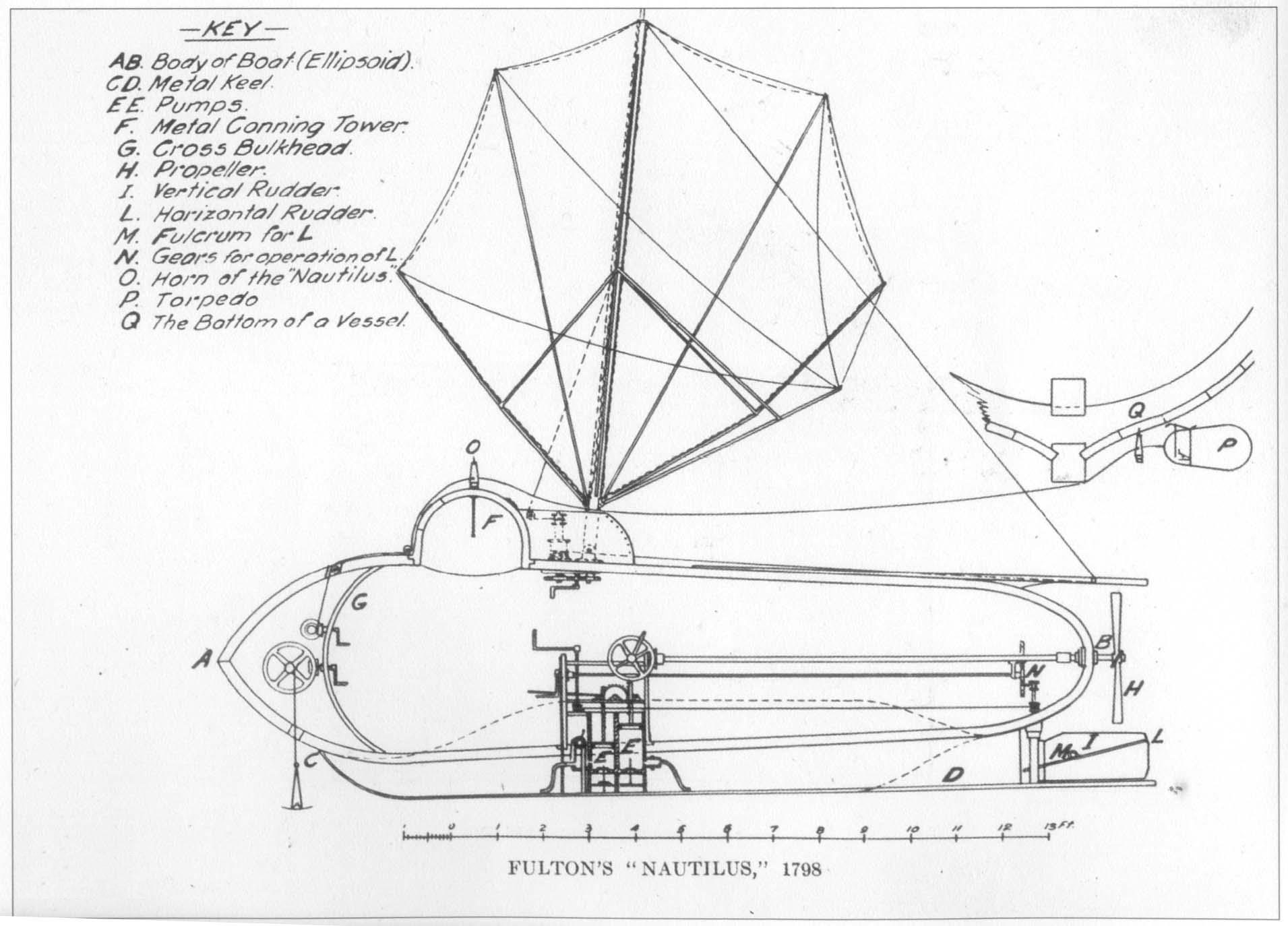
The Nautilus (1800)

Nautilus was a submarine designed by Robert Fulton and first tested in 1800. Though preceded by Cornelis Drebbel's vessel of 1620 and the Turtle, Nautilus is often considered to be the first practical submarine.

== Background ==
Nautilus was designed between 1793 and 1797 by the American inventor Robert Fulton, then living in the French First Republic. He unsuccessfully proposed to the Directory that they subsidize its construction as a means to ensure French naval dominance. His second, also unsuccessful, proposal to them was that he be paid nothing until Nautilus had actually sunk merchant shipping, and then only a small percentage of the prize money. Fulton directed his next proposal to the Minister of Marine, who granted him permission to build.

== Construction ==
Fulton built the first Nautilus of copper sheets over iron ribs at the Perrier boatyard in Rouen. It was 21 ft 3 in (6.48 m) long and 6 ft 4 in (1.93 m) in the beam. Propulsion was provided by a hand-cranked screw propeller. The hollow iron keel was the vessel's ballast tank, flooded and emptied to change buoyancy. Two horizontal fins, diving planes in modern terms, on the stubby rudder controlled angle of dive. Overall, Nautilus resembled a modern research submarine, such as the NR-1, having a long teardrop hull. The design included an observation dome, somewhat similar in appearance, if not function, to the conning tower of later submarines. When surfaced, a fan-shaped collapsible sail, reminiscent of those popular on Chinese ships, could be deployed. Air, beyond that enclosed within the vessel, could be provided by a snorkel constructed of waterproofed leather.

Nautilus was designed to carry what Fulton called a "carcass", a naval mine intended to be dragged into contact with an enemy ship. A device on the top of the dome drove a spiked eye into the enemy's wooden hull. The submarine then released its mine on a line that went through the eye. The submarine sped away. When the long line had paid out, the mine would strike the target hull and explode by a detonator. These "carcasses" were variously sized copper cylinders carrying between ten and two hundred pounds of gunpowder. Contact with the hull triggered a gunlock mechanism.

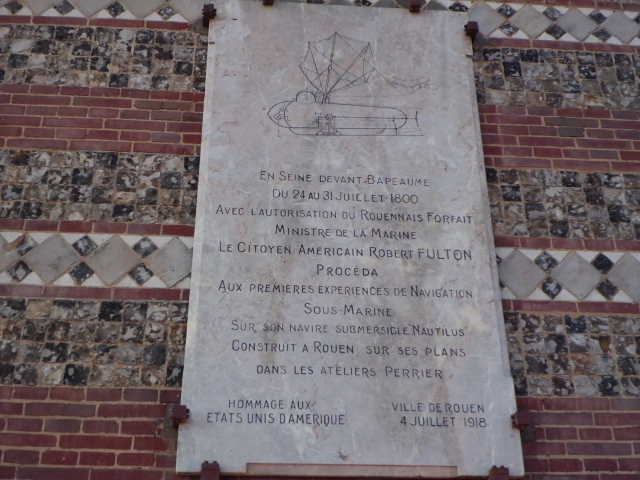
Commemorative plaque in the Port of Rouen

Nautilus's first test dives were in the Seine at Rouen, in the Saint-Gervais dock, beginning July 29, 1800. These tests were all successful, but the river current interfered with some tests, so Fulton took the boat to Le Havre to work in the quiet salt water of the harbor. He tested endurance with a candle lit, and found the flame did not challenge the air capacity of the snorkel. He also tested the speed of his two men cranking against that of two men rowing on the surface. Nautilus covered the 360 ft (110 m) course two minutes faster than the rowing crew. During this time he changed the screw propeller to one with four vanes, like a windmill, and modified the rudder.

Through friends like Gaspard Monge and Pierre-Simon Laplace, Fulton obtained an interview with Napoleon, but was unable to garner support for his vessel; however, Fulton's friends pushed the Minister of Marine into appointing a scholarly panel, to consist of Volney, Monge, and Laplace, to assess the submarine.

On July 3, 1801, at Le Havre, Fulton took the revised Nautilus down to the then-remarkable depth of 25 feet (7.5 m). With his three crewmen and two candles burning he remained for an hour without difficulty. Adding a copper "bomb" (globe) containing 200 ft^{3} (5.7m^{3}) of air extended the time underwater for the crew for at least four and a half hours. One of the renovations included a 1 1/2-inch-diameter (40 mm) glass in the dome, whose light he found sufficient for reading a watch, making candles during daylight unnecessary. Speed trials put Nautilus at two knots on the surface, and covering 400 m in 7 minutes. He also discovered that compasses worked underwater exactly as on the surface.

The first trial of a "carcass" destroyed a 40-foot sloop provided by the Admiralty. Fulton suggested that not only should they be used against specific ships by submarines, but be set floating into harbors and into estuaries with the tide to wreak havoc at random.

The overseeing committee enthusiastically recommended the building of two brass subs, 36 ft (11 m) long, 12 ft (3.7 m) wide, with a crew of eight, and air for eight hours of submersion.

In September, Napoleon expressed interest in seeing Nautilus, only to find that, as it had leaked badly, Fulton had had it dismantled and the more important bits destroyed at the end of the tests. Despite the many reports of success by reliable witnesses, like the Prefect Marine of Brest, Napoleon decided Fulton was a swindler and charlatan. The French navy had no enthusiasm for a weapon they considered suicidal for the crews even though Fulton had no problems and despite evidence it would be overwhelmingly destructive against conventional ships.

== Planned second vessel ==
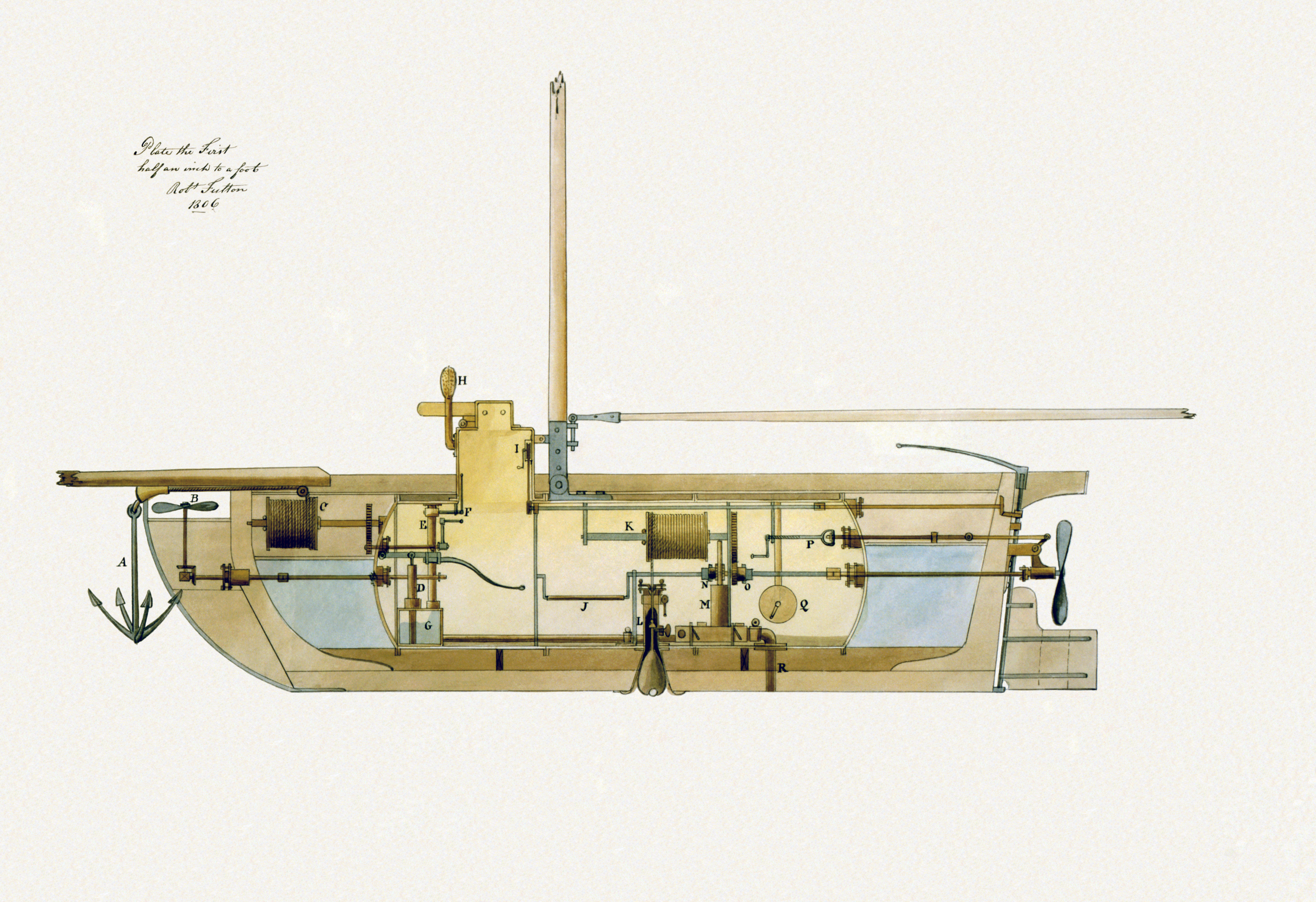
A cross-section of Fulton's 1806 submarine design

Though knowing the French had no further interest, the British wished to ensure a man of Fulton's talents was on their side; offering him £800 to come to England (his original planned destination before going to France) and develop a second Nautilus for them. The victory at Trafalgar made his work unnecessary, and he was increasingly sidelined until he left, in frustration, for America in October 1806. He left his papers on submarines with the American consul in London. He never asked for them, never referred to his Nautilus work, and the papers went unpublished until 1920.

These papers show that his British Nautilus was planned as a 35 ft (11 m) long, 10 ft (3 m) beam sea-going boat with a crew of six, to be provisioned for 20 days at sea. The upper surface was provided with 30 "carcass" compartments. The hull was to imitate a sea-going sloop with conventional-looking mast and sails that could be lowered and unstepped for submersion. The two-bladed propeller, still hand-cranked, folded up out of the water when surfaced to reduce drag. When submerged, air came through two streamlined ventilation pipes, and light from the conning tower. None of this was constructed.
