= Fulton County =

Fulton County is the name of eight counties in the United States of America. Most are named for Robert Fulton, inventor of the first practical steamboat:

- Fulton County, Arkansas, named after Governor William Savin Fulton
- Fulton County, Georgia
- Fulton County, Illinois
- Fulton County, Indiana
- Fulton County, Kentucky
- Fulton County, New York
- Fulton County, Ohio
- Fulton County, Pennsylvania

== Other uses ==
- Fulton County (novel) by James Goldman
- Atlanta–Fulton County Stadium, former home to the Atlanta Braves (1966–96) and the Atlanta Falcons (1966–91)
