= USS Fulton (SP-247) =

Minesweeper of the United States Navy

- Lackawanna Railroad tugboat Fulton

History

United States
- Name: USS Fulton
- Namesake: Robert Fulton
- Builder: Staten Island Shipbuilding Company, Port Richmond, Staten Island, New York
- Completed: 1909
- Acquired: 30 April 1917
- Renamed: USS SP-247 11 April 1918
- Fate: Returned to owner 12 August 1919
- Notes: Operated as civilian vessel Fulton 1909-1917 and from 1919

General characteristics
- Type: Minesweeper / tugboat
- Tonnage: 229 GRT, 156 NRT
- Length: 93.5 ft (28.5 m)
- Beam: 25.2 ft (7.7 m)
- Draft: 11.0 ft (3.4 m)
- Depth: 12.1 ft (3.7 m)
- Installed power: 850 ihp (630 kW)
- Propulsion: Single compound steam engine, one shaft
- Complement: 7; 18 as mine sweeper
- Armament: single 1-pounder gun
- Notes: steel hull

The fourth USS Fulton (SP-247), later USS SP-247, was a commercial tug built in 1909. (Note: This Fulton should not be confused with the submarine tender USS Fulton (AS-1), which was in commission at the same time.) She was commissioned by the United States Navy and served as a minesweeper in 1917 in the Third Naval District and returned to her previous owners two years later. She remained in service, latterly as Catherine Carroll, at least into the 1960s.

== Construction and commercial service ==
Fulton was built as a steel-hulled tug in 1909 by the Staten Island Shipbuilding Company at Port Richmond on Staten Island, New York as Yard Number 489. The tug had a length of 93.5 ft (28.5 m), a beam of 25.2 ft (7.7 m), a depth of 12.1 ft (3.7 m) and a draft of 11.0 ft (3.4 m). She measured 229 GRT and 156 NRT and was powered by a compound steam engine of 850 ihp (630 kW) driving a single propeller.

The tug was built for the Delaware, Lackawanna and Western Railroad Co. to tow barges carrying rail cars. She was registered at New York, with US Official Number 207060 and call-sign LBHQ. The vessel was named after Robert Fulton who was honored in New York City's Hudson–Fulton Celebration in 1909 on the centenary of his development of practical steamship technology.

== World War I service ==
The U.S. Navy acquired her under charter on 30 April 1917 for service as a Section mine sweeper. After arming with a single 1-pounder gun, she was commissioned as USS Fulton (SP-247) on 22 September with two officers and sixteen men assigned to the Third Naval District. On 11 April 1918 her official name was reduced to SP-247.

The Navy returned Fulton to her previous owner on 12 August 1919.

== Return to commercial service ==
In 1919 Fulton resumed service with the Delaware, Lackawanna and Western Railroad. By 1958 she had been sold to Tug Fulton Corp., New York and renamed Catherine Carroll. The tug continued in service until at least 1964.
