= Fulton, Michigan =

Fulton, Michigan may refer to a few places in the U.S. state of Michigan:

- Fulton, Kalamazoo County, Michigan, an unincorporated community in Wakeshma Township
- Fulton, Keweenaw County, Michigan, an unincorporated community in Allouez Township
- Fulton Township, Michigan in Gratiot County
