= Fulton, New York =

Fulton is the name of some places in the U.S. state of New York:

- Fulton, Oswego County, New York, a city
- Fulton, Schoharie County, New York, a town
- Fulton County, New York

== See also ==
- Fulton (disambiguation)
