= Fulton Township =

Fulton Township may refer to:

- Fulton Township, Fulton County, Arkansas, in Fulton County, Arkansas
- Fulton Township, Whiteside County, Illinois
- Fulton Township, Fountain County, Indiana
- Fulton Township, Muscatine County, Iowa
- Fulton Township, Webster County, Iowa
- Fulton Township, Michigan
- Fulton Township, Fulton County, Ohio
- Fulton Township, Lancaster County, Pennsylvania
