= USS Dick Fulton =

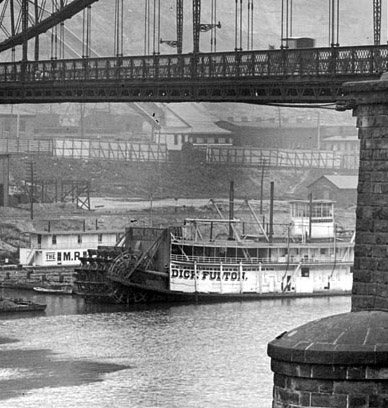
- Dick Fulton in 1900

History

United States
- Laid down: 1857
- Acquired: 1862
- In service: circa May 1862
- Out of service: at war's end, 1865 (est.)
- Stricken: after 1901 (est.)
- Home port: Pittsburgh
- Fate: Sold for civilian use

General characteristics
- Displacement: 123 tons
- Propulsion: stern-wheel steamer

USS Dick Fulton (also called Fulton) was a 123-ton stern-wheel steamer used as an auxiliary vessel in the United States Ram Fleet during the American Civil War.

Dick Fulton was built in 1857 in Allegheny County, Pennsylvania. She was repaired or modified there in 1862, and 1878.

During the Civil War she was used as a tender and ram in the United States Ram Fleet, from 1862 to ca. 1864.

== War service ==
In March 1862 Grant and Buell were preparing for a campaign into Mississippi. A crucial part of the campaign would be the capturing of Island No. 10. On 31 March Scranton commissioned Charles Ellet, Jr. to create a "Ram Fleet" in twenty days. In one of his transactions Ellet bought Lioness and Fulton for $20,000 in Pittsburgh. These two boats were small, fast stern-wheelers, he intended them to be used as tenders and dispatch boats. In all he bought five vessels, the first problem was they were too big too pass through the locks on the Ohio River, so they were modified so they could be floated over the falls before the river fell. All had their bows armored at New Albany or Mound City, and were ready for service at the end of April. Meanwhile, Grant had succeeded in sending two ironclads past Island No. 10 opening the Mississippi River to Fort Pillow, but Ellet continued with his plans. Come 26 April Ellet was with his fleet in Pittsburgh. The fleet he had assembled of nine vessels were not armed and were all old riverboats, it included the stern-wheeled towboats Fulton and T.D Horner, which were not intended for fighting. Ellet working for the War Department as opposed to the Navy, spent his time reinforcing the rams.

On 6 June 1862, she attended the First Battle of Memphis, by 19 June she was with the squadron at the mouth of the St. Francis River, and then headed for Greenville.

Charles Ellet died at Memphis, he had led the rams in the battle on USS Queen of the West. During this complete Union victory, Queen of the West and Monarch both rammed and sank the Confederate flagship CSS Colonel Lovell. Ellet wounded during the battle (the only Union casualty), died of his injuries hospital at Cairo, Illinois fifteen days later on 21 June.

On 22 June Fulton repaired her burned boiler at Paw Paw Island before heading downriver with Monarch and Lancaster on a scouting mission. Fulton in early 1863 was operating along with Monarch in the Greenville area moving provisions and stores.

Ellet's brother Brigadier General Alfred W. Ellet newly in command took his Federal rams, now referred to as the Mississippi Marine Brigade, were a part of the Western Flotilla in the charge of Charles Henry Davis. The flotilla moved downstream from Memphis towards the besieged Vicksburg, Mississippi on 25 June, where they intended to run its batteries, link up with Farragut, and attack Vicksburg on 28 June. Ellet was on his flagship Monarch, and had with him Lancaster, Mingo, Lioness, and Dick Fulton. The rams had 300 hand-picked sharpshooters with them from the 53rd Illinois Infantry Regiment, an observer described the fleet as dark, silent, and sinister.

The Confederates damaged her at Cyrus Point on 10 February 1863.

In March 1863 she was commanded by First Master S. Cadman, she had been recently repaired and was at the Yazoo Pass with the ram Lioness, and the tinclad Petrel. On going through the pass the overhanging willows damaged the fleets tall chimney's and high cabins. On arrival at Coldwater they had lost their chimneys and their wheels were damaged, one of Fulton's boilers had broken down and she was lagging behind the others. The other two vessels set about gathering cotton so the boats could use it to protect their sharpshooters on their upper decks. They entered Tallahassee on 10 March and met and destroyed the heavily cotton-laden sidewheel steamer Thirty-Fifth Parallel. On 11 March the squadron attacked Fort Pemberton and rammed Star of the West which had previously been scuttled as a defense mechanism. The engagement was not a success and the vessels returned to the Yazoo Pass. Porter was not to use the vessel again in a meaningful way other as low key escort work, Fulton from that point was used as a tow boat.

After the Confederacy's naval capability declined she then went onto serve in the successor to the Ram Fleet, the Mississippi Marine Brigade.

She was involved in a collision with Hawkeye at Point Pittsburgh on 5 February 1864. She was raised and rebuilt. Her engineer was killed in the incident.

In March 1864 she is in Vicksburg with several barges of coal. The brigade was disestablished in August that year.

== Post war ==
In August and September 1898 Dick Fulton was put in for repair at the Monongahela River, at the Elizabeth Marine Ways in Elizabeth, Pennsylvania. She was photographed in 1900 under the Point Bridge in Pittsburgh hauling coal.

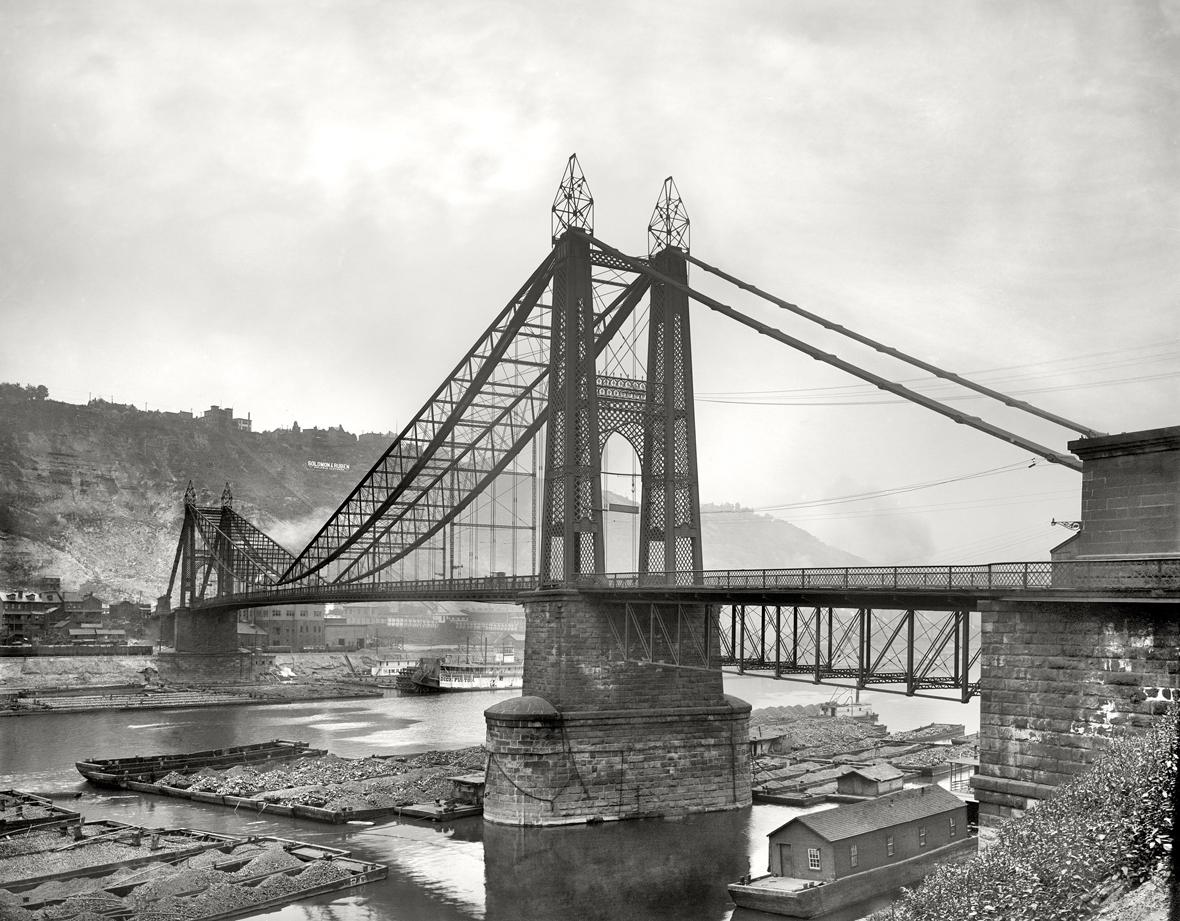
The original Point Bridge, with Dick Fulton underneath
