= United States floating battery Demologos =

First warship to use steam power

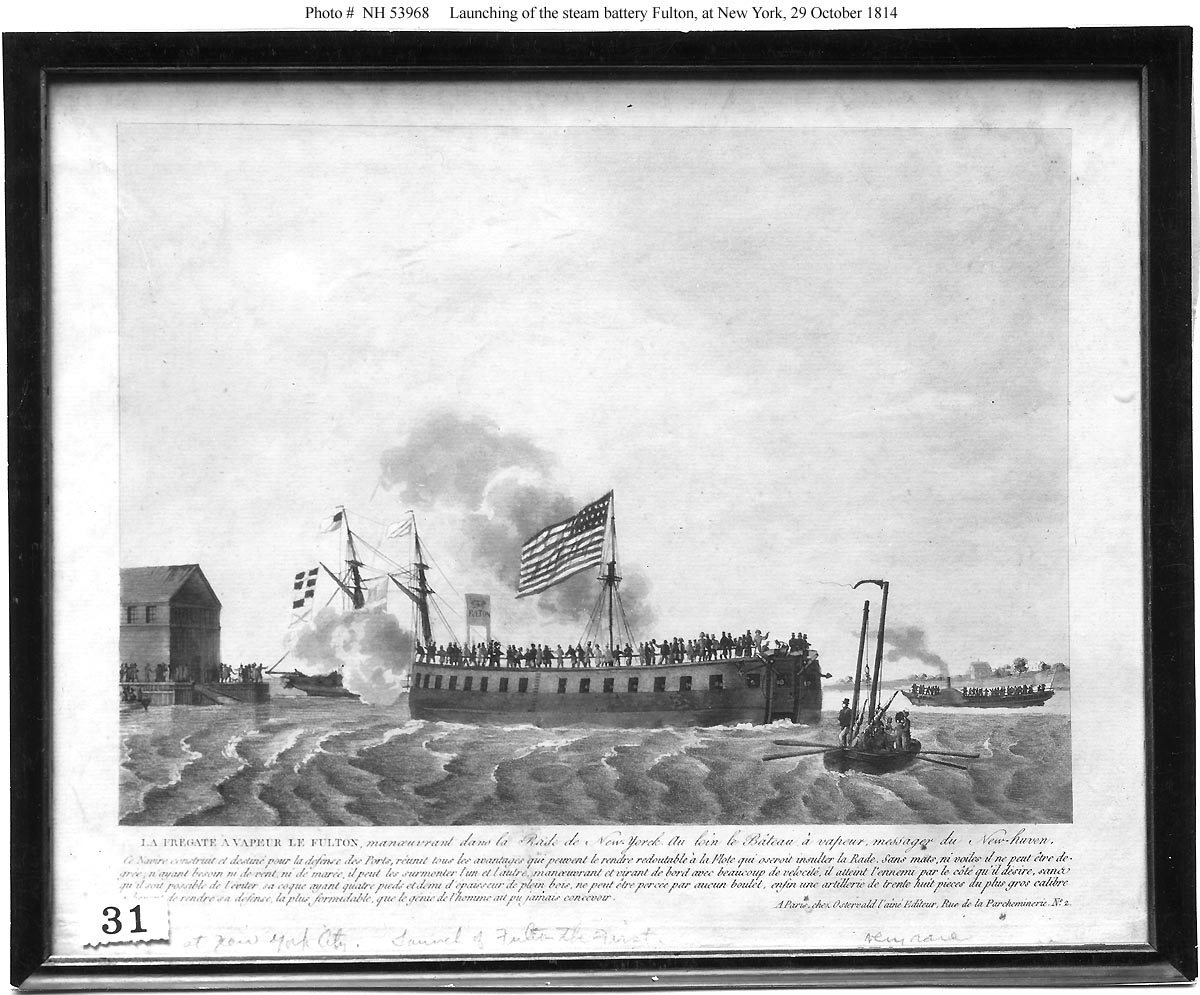
- Demologos, first steam warship

History

United States
- Name: Demologos, later Fulton
- Ordered: 1814
- Builder: company belonging to Robert Fulton
- Laid down: 20 June 1814
- Launched: 29 October 1814
- Commissioned: June 1816
- Fate: Destroyed in an accidental gunpowder explosion, 4 June 1829

General characteristics
- Class & type: Steam battery
- Displacement: 1,450 tons
- Length: 153 ft 2 in (46.69 m)
- Beam: 58 ft (18 m)
- Draft: 13 ft (4.0 m)
- Propulsion: Steam, 1 cylinder 120 hp (89 kW)
- Speed: 5.5 knots (10.2 km/h; 6.3 mph)
- Armament: 30 × 32-pounder guns 2 × 100-pounder Columbiads fitted to fire at enemy ships below their waterline
- Armor: 5' reinforced timber planking

Demologos was the first warship to be propelled by a steam engine. She was a wooden floating battery built to defend New York Harbor from the Royal Navy during the War of 1812. The vessel was designed to a unique pattern by Robert Fulton, and was renamed Fulton after his death. Because of the prompt end of the war, Demologos never saw action, and no other ship like her was built.

== History ==
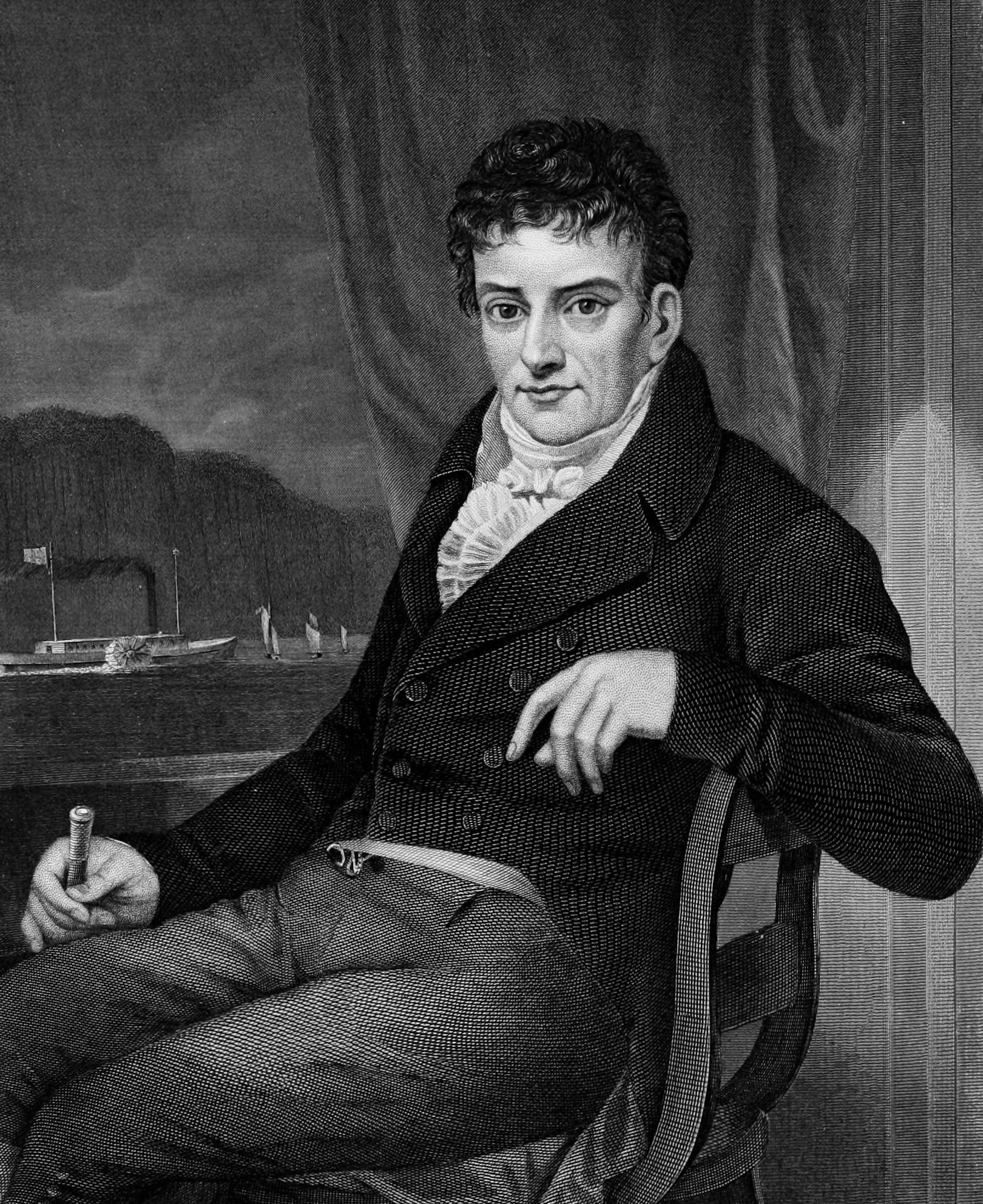
Robert Fulton, designer

On 9 March 1814, Congress authorized the construction of a steam warship to be designed by Robert Fulton, a pioneer of commercial steamers in North America. The construction of the ship began on 20 June 1814, at the civilian yard of Adam and Noah Brown, and the ship was launched on 29 October. After sea trials she was delivered to the United States Navy in June 1816. The ship was never formally named; Fulton christened it Demologos or Demologus, though following his death in February 1815, the ship was named Fulton.

By the time she was completed, the war for which Demologos had been built had ended. She saw only one day of active service, when she carried President James Madison on a tour of New York Harbor. A two-masted lateen rig was added by the orders of her first commander, Captain David Porter. In 1821, her armament and machinery were removed. The remainder of her career was spent laid up in reserve; after 1825 she served as the floating barracks for Brooklyn Navy Yard. She came to an end on 4 June 1829 in a gunpowder explosion. She exploded while lying at anchor, killing an officer and 47 men.

== Design ==
A catamaran, her paddlewheel was sandwiched between two hulls. Each hull was constructed 5 ft (1.5 m) thick for protection against gunfire. The steam engine, mounted below the waterline in one of the hulls, had a top speed of 5.5 knots (10.2 km/h) speed.

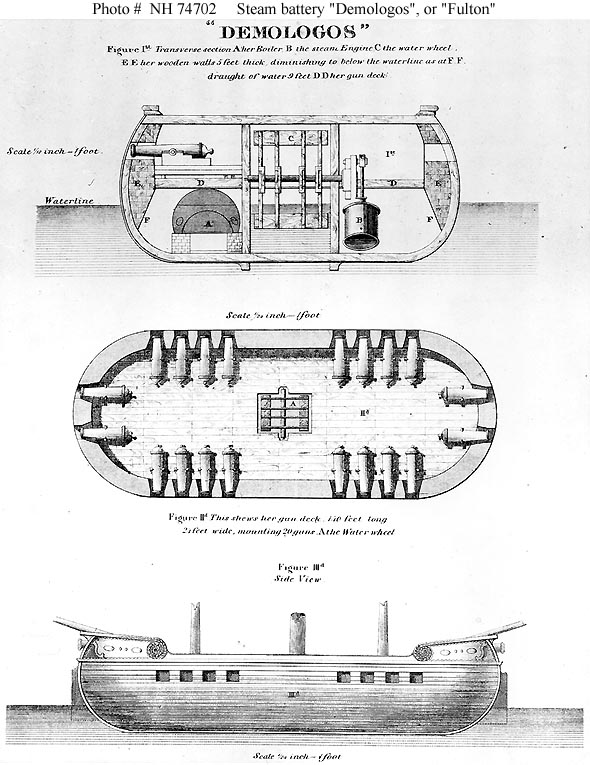
Three-view of Demologos as originally portrayed to the US government. The resulting vessel differed greatly from this early proposal.
