= Statue of Standing Bear =

Statue in the U.S. Capitol

Coordinates: 38.8896°N 77.0096°W

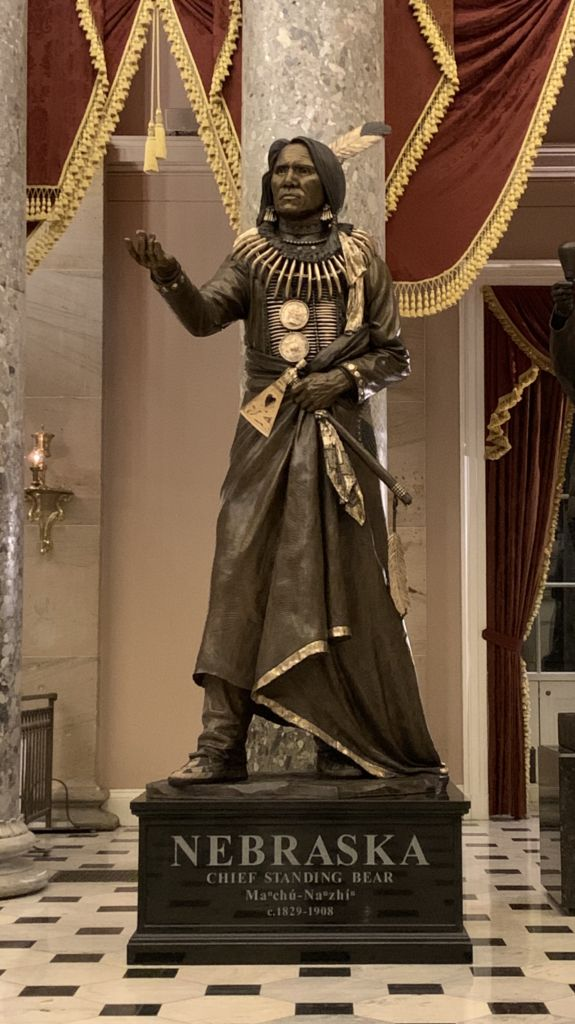
- Artist: Benjamin Victor
- Medium: Bronze sculpture
- Subject: Standing Bear
- Location: National Statuary Hall Collection, Washington, D.C., United States

In 2019, the U.S. state of Nebraska donated a bronze sculpture of Standing Bear by Benjamin Victor to the National Statuary Hall Collection. The statue is installed in the United States Capitol's National Statuary Hall, in Washington, D.C.

The statue of Standing Bear replaced a statue of William Jennings Bryan by Rudulph Evans, which was similarly donated to the National Statuary Hall Collection in 1937, but relocated in 2019 to the Nebraska National Guard Museum in Seward, Nebraska.

== Background ==
Standing Bear (Ponca official orthography: Maⁿchú-Naⁿzhíⁿ/Macunajin) was forcibly relocated with the Ponca tribe from their lands in Nebraska to the Indian Territory (now Oklahoma) in 1878. His first son Bear Shield died at the reservation, so Standing Bear set out with several others to bury his son's remains at his birthplace in Nebraska. The group was arrested and detained by Brigadier General George Crook at Fort Omaha for having left the reservation without permission from the U.S. government. Standing Bear brought a legal case in the U.S. District Court in Omaha, but the U.S. government argued that as a Native American "Indian", he was not a "person" under the meaning of the law. In United States ex rel. Standing Bear v. Crook, Judge Elmer Dundy ruled on 12 May 1879 that "an Indian is a PERSON", and ordered the group to be released.

== Description ==
The bronze statue stands over 9 ft (2.7 m) high, on a low black granite pedestal. The subject is portrayed in traditional Native American clothing, with an eagle feather in his hair, a necklace of bear claws and two large Indian Peace Medals, and a pipe tomahawk in his left hand. The right hand is outstretched, to emphasize words spoken at the trial in May 1897 through his interpreter Susette La Flesche: "My hand is not the color of yours, but if I pierce it, I shall feel pain. If you pierce your hand, you also feel pain. The blood that will flow from mine will be the same color as yours. The same god made us both. I am a man."

The front of the pedestal bears the inscription: "NEBRASKA/ CHIEF STANDING BEAR/ Manchú-Nanzhín/ c. 1829–1908", with quotations from Standing Bear's statement to the court inscribed on the sides.

There are two other bronze statues by Benjamin Victor in the National Statuary Hall Collection: a statue of Sarah Winnemucca donated by Nevada in 2005, and a statue of Norman Borlaug donated by Iowa in 2014.
