= Statue of William Jennings Bryan =

Sculpture by Rudulph Evans

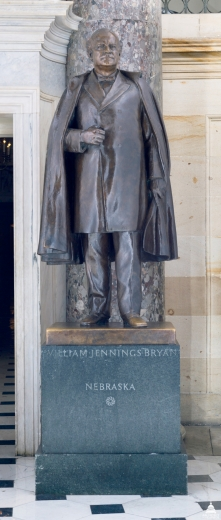
- The sculpture in the National Statuary Hall Collection
- Artist: Rudolph Evans
- Year: 1937
- Medium: Bronze sculpture
- Subject: William Jennings Bryan
- Location: Washington, D.C. (1937–2019), Seward, Nebraska (2019–present), United States

William Jennings Bryan is a bronze sculpture depicting the American politician of the same name by Rudulph Evans, which was installed in the United States Capitol's National Statuary Hall, in Washington, D.C., as part of the National Statuary Hall Collection. The statue was gifted by the U.S. state of Nebraska in 1937.

In 2019, a statue of Standing Bear replaced the statue of Bryan in the Statuary Hall. As Bryan had helped recruit and was commander of the 3rd Nebraska Volunteer Infantry Regiment during the Spanish–American War, the statue was relocated to the Nebraska National Guard Museum in Seward, Nebraska.

== See also ==
- 1937 in art
