= George Gervin GameAbove Center =

Sports and entertainment venue on the campus of Eastern Michigan University

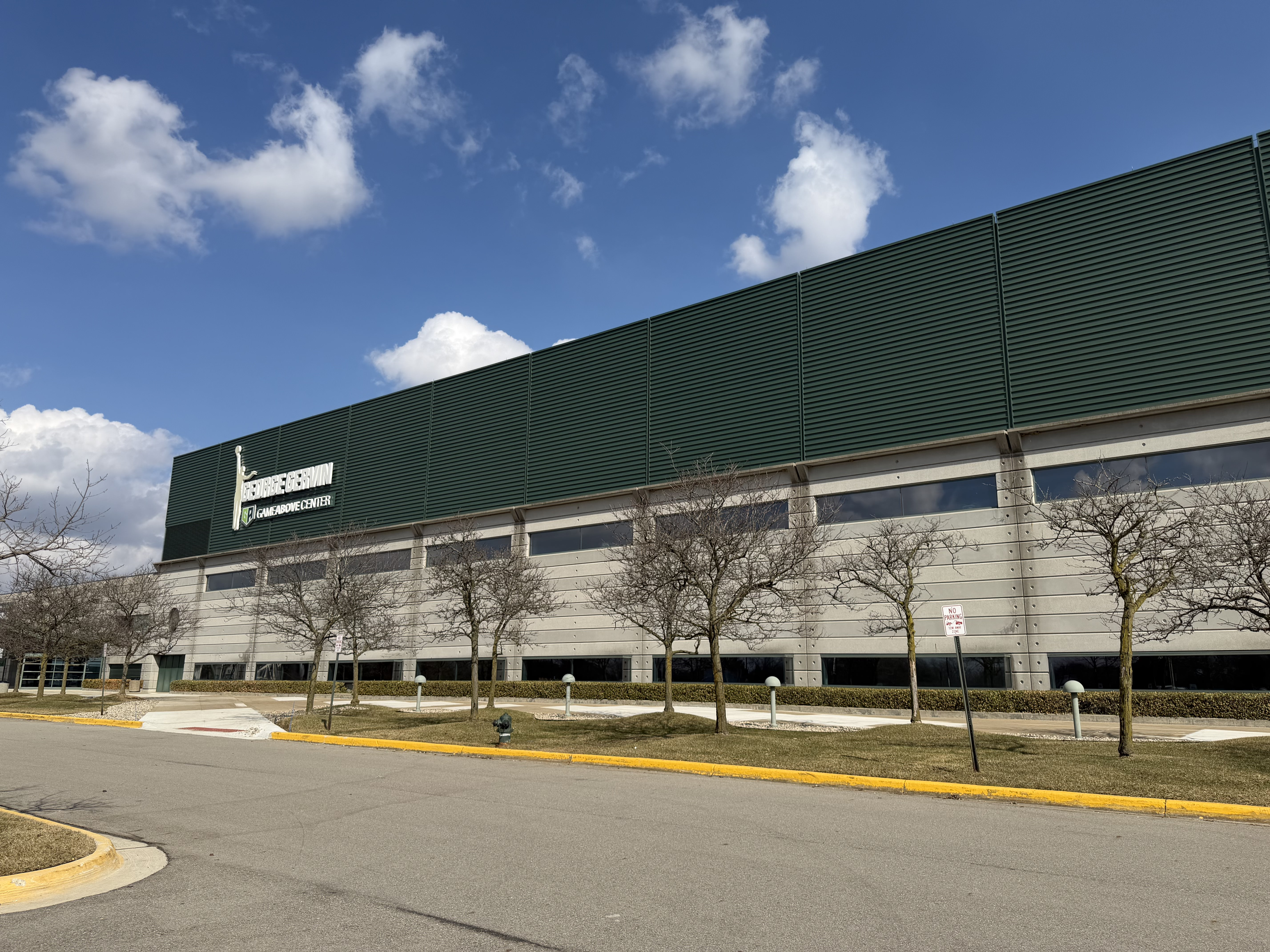
- George Gervin GameAbove Center in 2026
- Interactive map of George Gervin GameAbove Center
- Former names: Convocation Center (1998–2021)
- Location: 799 North Hewitt Road; Ypsilanti, Michigan 48197
- Coordinates: 42°15′16″N 83°38′50″W
- Owner: Eastern Michigan University
- Operator: Eastern Michigan University
- Capacity: 8,824
- Executive suites: 8
- Public transit: TheRide

Construction
- Groundbreaking: 1996
- Opened: November 25, 1998
- Cost: $29.6 million ($58.5 million in 2025 dollars)
- Architect: Rossetti Architects
- General contractor: Barton Malow

Tenant
- Eastern Michigan Eagles

Website
- emueagles.com/facilities/gervin-gameabove-center/1

The George Gervin GameAbove Center, formerly known as the Convocation Center, is a multi-purpose sports and entertainment complex located on the campus of Eastern Michigan University in Ypsilanti, Michigan. It is home to the Eastern Michigan Eagles men's and women's basketball teams, and also hosts special events including concerts, conferences, graduations, and fairs.

Opened in 1998 as part of a campus upgrade initiative, the George Gervin GameAbove Center is a 204,316-square-foot (18,981.6 m^{2}) structure that features three levels including arena, concourse, and office. The arena also has multiple seating configurations to maximize space usage.

The arena was rededicated in honor of EMU alumnus George Gervin in 2021. A statue of Gervin by sculptor Benjamin Victor was unveiled in 2023 in a ceremony attended by Gervin.

== History ==
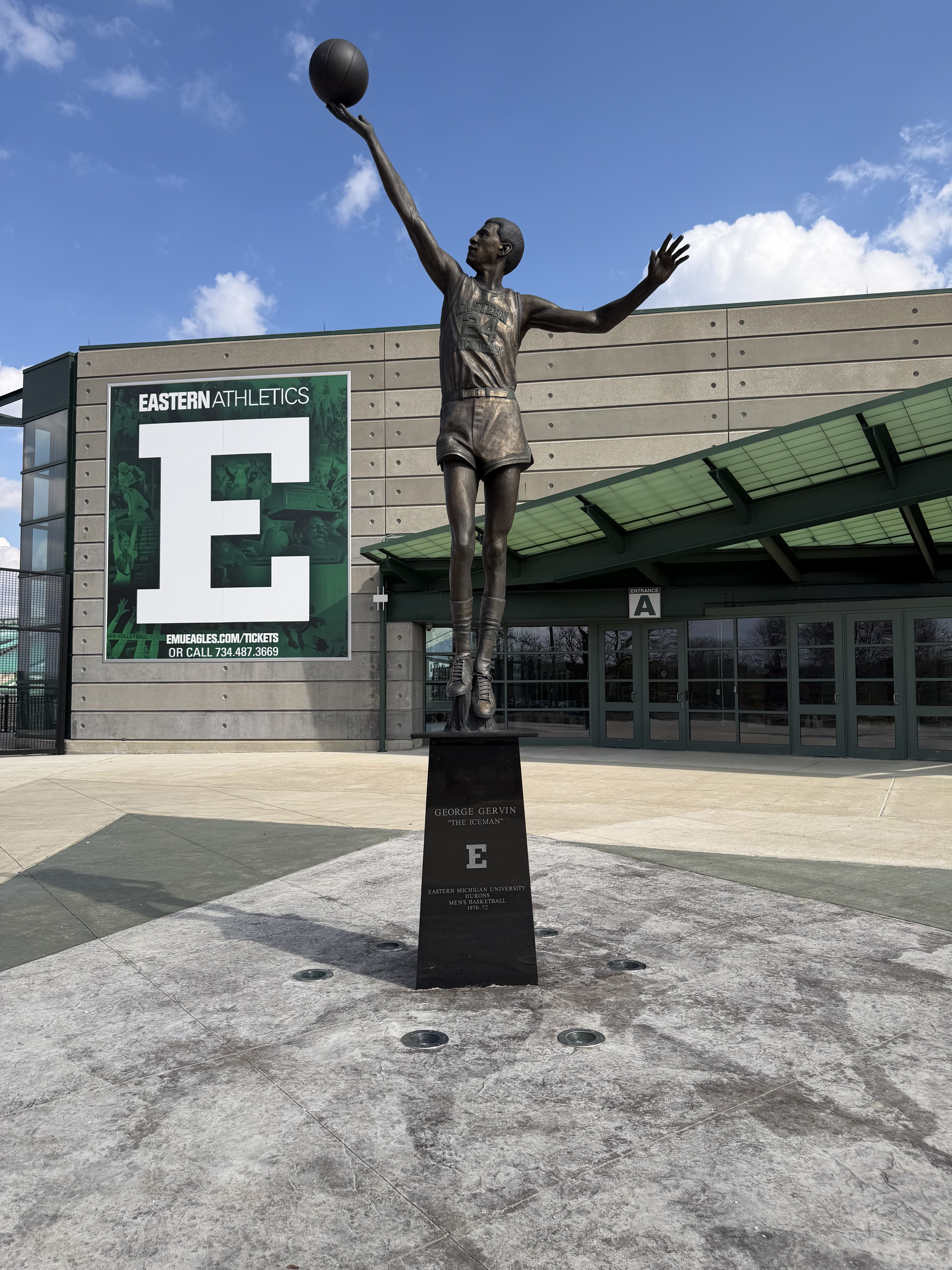
Statue of Gervin outside the arena

Construction began in 1996 and was completed in time for the 1998-99 winter sports season; its first men's basketball game was on November 25, 1998, against Boise State, who defeated EMU 54–53. The Convocation Center was officially dedicated before a near-sellout crowd on December 9, 1998, in an 86–63 loss to Michigan. Since its opening, it has served as home court for the Eagles' men's and women's basketball and volleyball teams. The EMU wrestling team has held several dual meets on the arena floor. It has also served as the site for two Mid-American Conference Championships. EMU hosted the 2000 MAC Gymnastics Championship and the 2002 MAC Wrestling Championship. It has been the host site for four first-round MAC Women's Basketball Tournament games, three first-round MAC Volleyball Tournament games and one first-round game for the men's basketball squad. On December 11, 2021, the arena was renamed to the George Gervin GameAbove Center in honor of Basketball Hall of Fame member and EMU alumnus George Gervin.

Along with their commitment to EMU Athletics, it has hosted concerts. It is also the site for EMU's spring and winter commencement ceremonies. Other events have included youth sporting competitions, high school commencements, trade shows, job fairs, conventions, charity and community awareness events and a circus.

== Layout ==
The 204,316-square-foot (18,981.6 m^{2}) facility features three levels (arena, concourse, and office) and three seating configurations to maximize crowd capacity and space usage. The largest seating capacity is for center-stage entertainment activities, with 9,500 seats available. The capacity for basketball games is approximately 8,800.

EMU's athletic administration is located on the office level, along with offices for the EMU football, men's and women's basketball and volleyball coaching staffs. The EMU Sports Information Office, as well as offices for the staff, are located on the office level.

The main athletic training room and office space for EMU's sports medicine staff is located on the arena level as are strength and conditioning facilities and equipment rooms.

=== Floor and capacity ===
- 360 Center Stage (9,375)
- Athletic Events (8,800)
- End Stage (7,765; sold at 270 degrees / 6,442; sold at 180 degrees)

=== Rentable spaces ===
- Arena Floor (with seats retracted)
  - 170' x 120'
  - 20,000 sq ft (1,900 m^{2})
- Arena Floor (without seats retracted)
  - 131' x 79'
  - 10,000 sq ft (930 m^{2})
- Atrium
  - 66' x 103'
  - 7,000 sq ft (650 m^{2})
- Eagle's Nest
  - 75 person capacity
  - can be divided into three smaller rooms
  - Premium viewing area for the arena
- Dressing Rooms / Auxiliary Spaces
  - Two visiting team locker rooms, each equipped with carpet, 16 full lockers and full shower and restroom amenities
  - Two officials locker rooms, each equipped with four full lockers and full shower and restroom amenities
  - Media Room A, a 33' x 17' carpeted room capable of seating up to 60 theater style. This room is ideal for production or food service location

== Athletic events ==
=== EMU basketball ===
On March 18, 2014, Eastern Michigan received national attention when a CollegeInsider.com tournament game at the Convo – EMU's first men's basketball postseason game in 16 years – drew 373 fans. Senior forward Glenn Bryant tweeted his frustration at the small crowd, which was picked up by national media. Despite a 22-win season, EMU drew an average of 901 fans per home game in 2013–14 (10.2% of capacity). In 2014–15, EMU chalked up 21 wins and another postseason berth (at the College Basketball Invitational); however, attendance was even lower, just 776 per contest. Attendances have picked up since then, however: another 21-win season (and another CBI berth) in 2015-16 drew 1,228 per game; a 16–17 mark in 2016-17 averaged 1,245; and the 2017–18 season saw Eastern draw 1,513 fans per contest, including 4,767 for their home opener and 1,138 for a CIT victory over Niagara. (Eastern has never come close to selling out in its history; even the 1998 opener against Michigan featured over a thousand empty seats.)

=== 2008 WNBA Finals ===
Due to the unavailability of The Palace of Auburn Hills, the Detroit Shock moved three WNBA playoff games to the Convo Center in the fall of 2008: two games in the Eastern Conference Finals and Game 3 of the 2008 WNBA Finals, against the San Antonio Silver Stars. The Shock won game 3 and the WNBA title, 76–60; the contest was broadcast nationally on ESPN.

== Special events ==
The building serves as the home to EMU athletics while also serving host to a wide variety of special events including concerts, conferences, graduations, fairs, trade shows, political rallies, and more. Some of the more notable events include Jay-Z, Bob Seger, Bernie Sanders, Ellie Goulding, The Killers, Stone Sour, Halestorm, Tiesto, St. Joseph Charity Ball, Harlem Globetrotters, and the 2008 WNBA Finals.

The center was used for the graduation of the EMU class of 2000. The main speaker was Bill Clinton with an intro from his Secretary of Transportation Rodney Slater, an EMU alumnus.

== Gallery ==
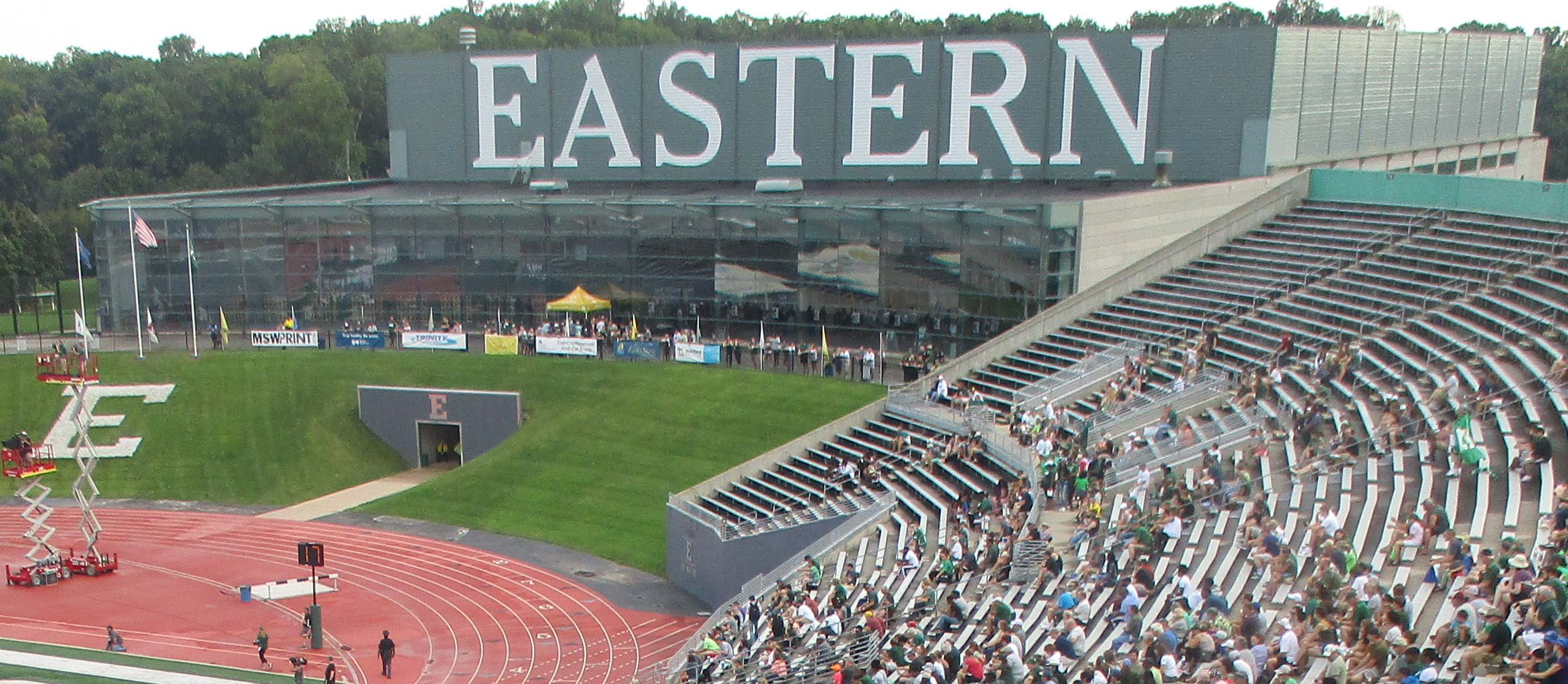
Exterior seen from Rynearson Stadium in 2019

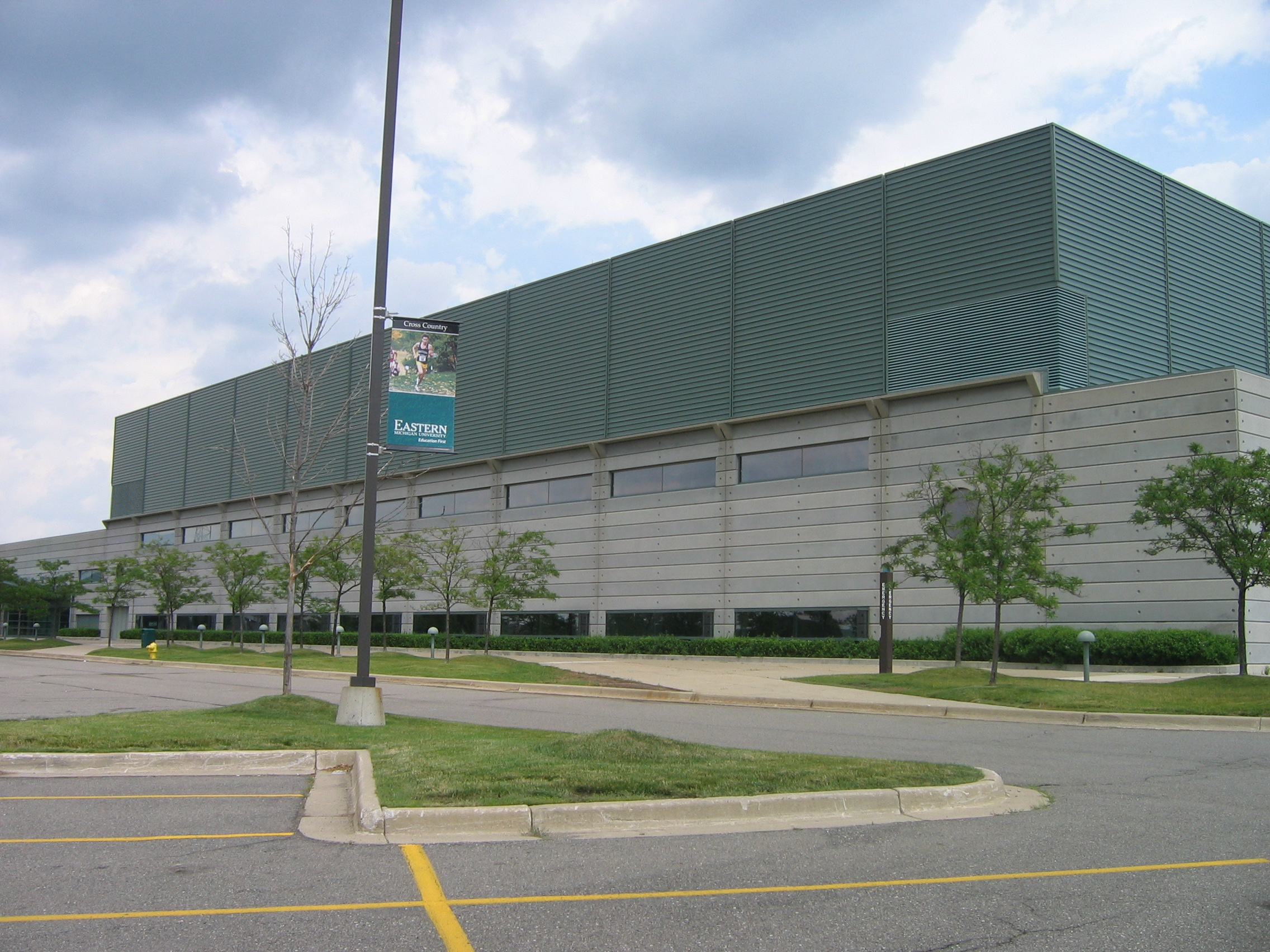
Exterior in 2008

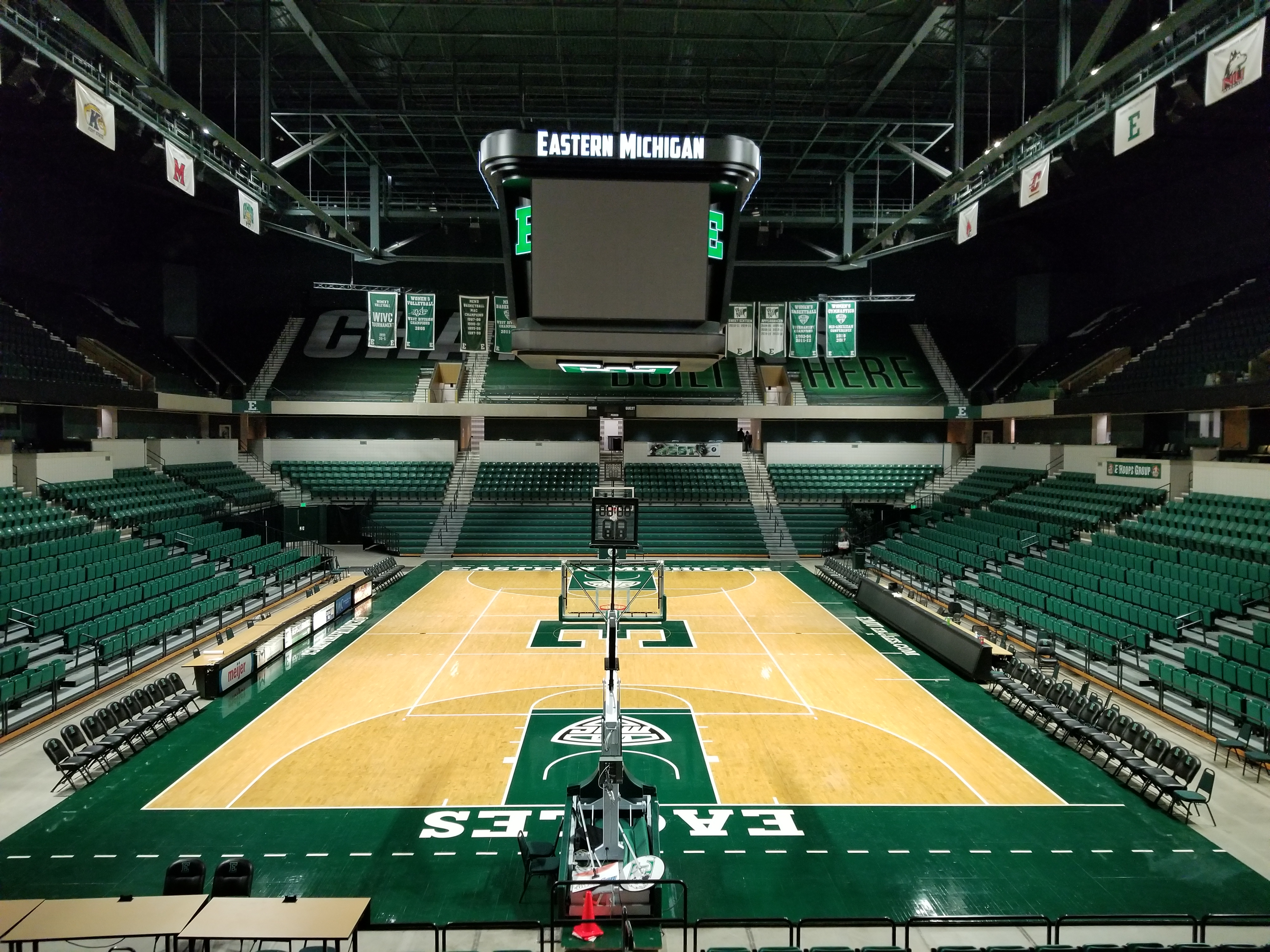
Interior in 2018

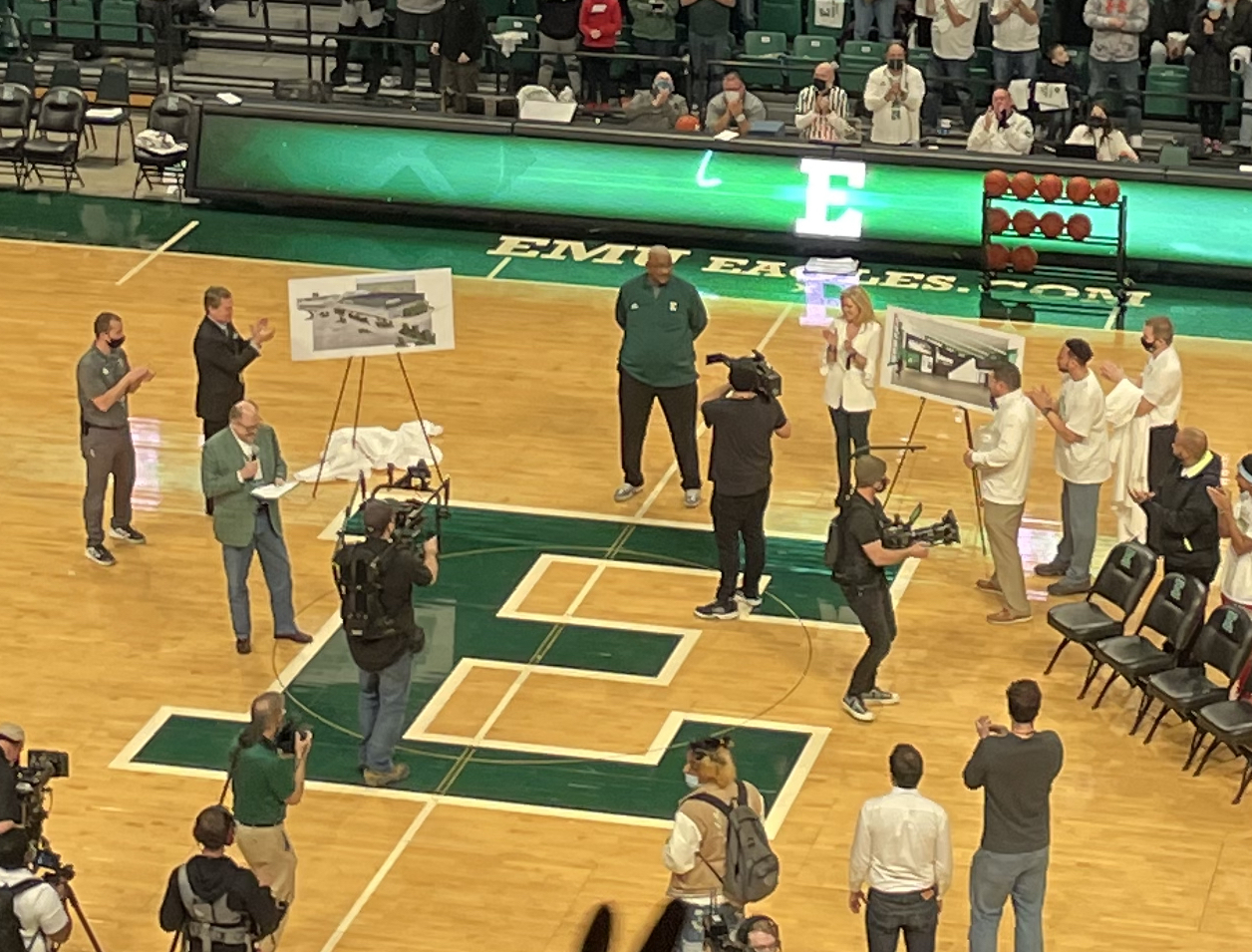
Gervin being honored at rededication

== See also ==
- List of NCAA Division I basketball arenas
