= Statue of Henry Mower Rice =

Statue in the U.S. Capitol

Henry Mower Rice
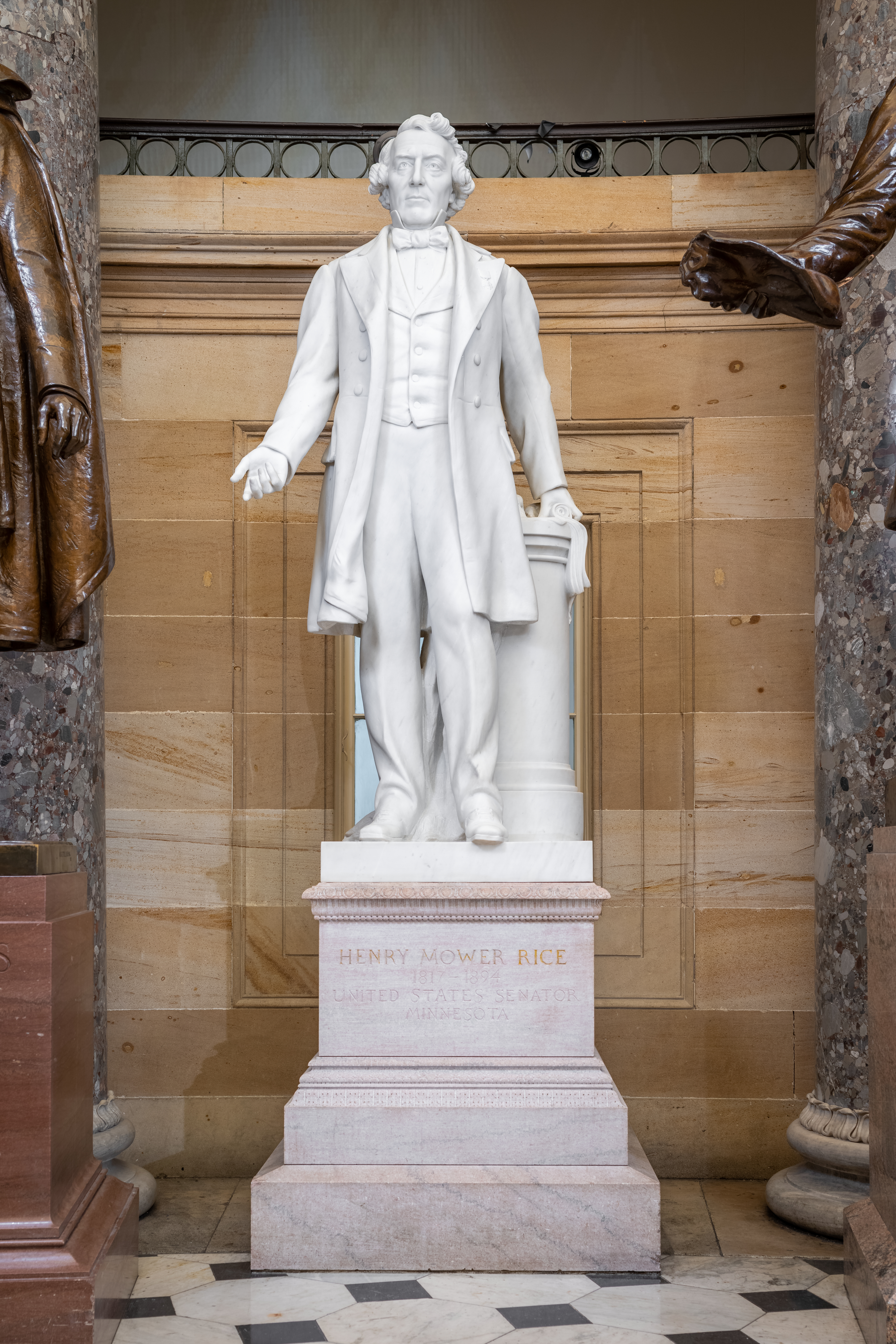
- The statue at the National Statuary Hall in 2023
- Artist: Frederick Triebel
- Medium: Marble sculpture
- Subject: Henry Mower Rice
- Location: Washington, D.C., United States

Henry Mower Rice is a marble sculpture of Henry Mower Rice created by Frederick Triebel and placed in the National Statuary Hall Collection in the Capitol Building in Washington, D.C., one of the two statues there from the State of Minnesota. It was dedicated in 1916. The work cost $7,500 and was unveiled in Washington on February 8, 1916.

== See also ==
- 1916 in art
