= Statue of George L. Shoup =

Statue in the U.S. Capitol

George L. Shoup
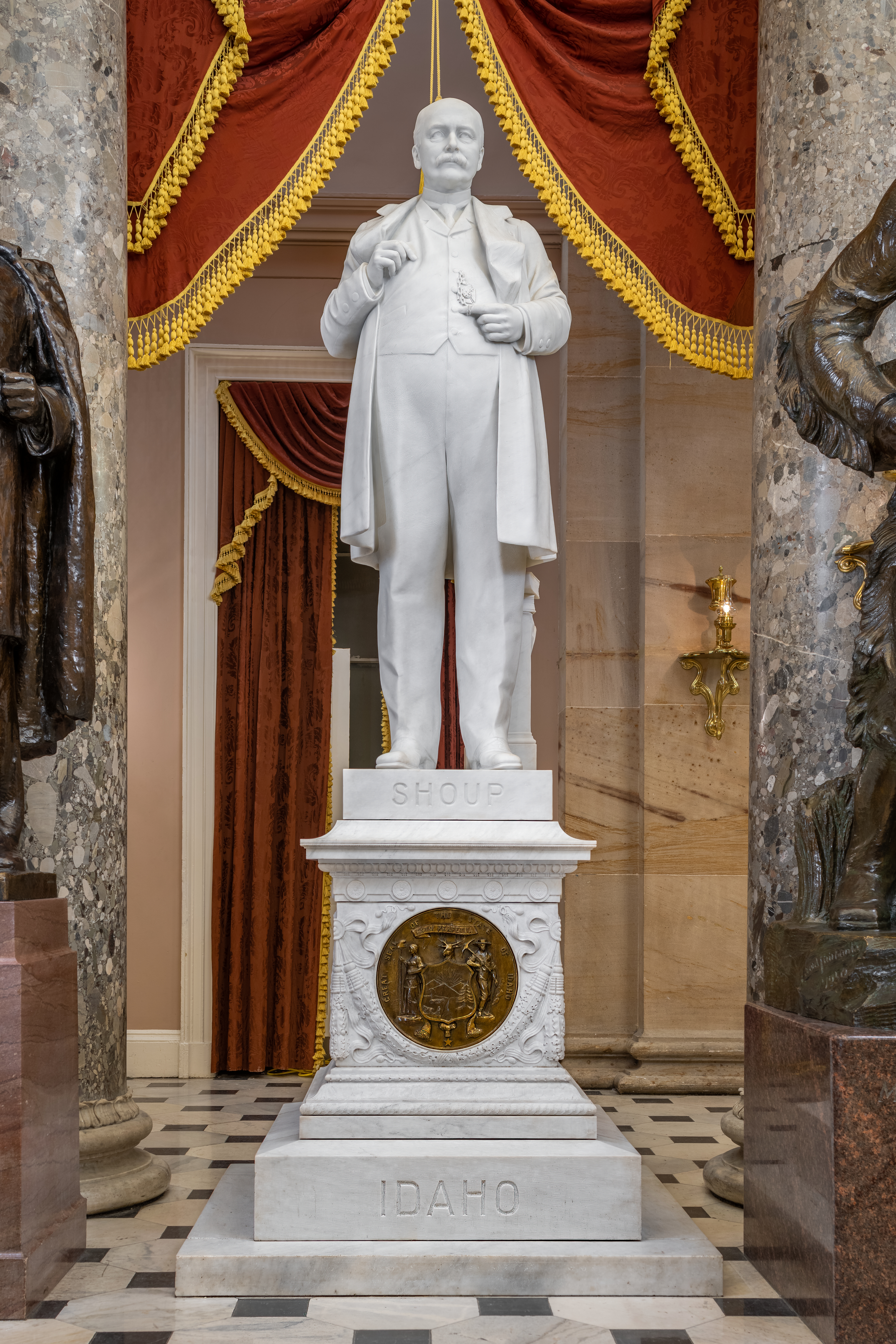
- The statue at the National Statuary Hall in 2023
- Artist: Frederick Triebel
- Medium: Marble sculpture
- Subject: George L. Shoup
- Location: Washington, D.C., United States

George L. Shoup is a marble sculpture of George L. Shoup created by Frederick Triebel and placed in the National Statuary Hall Collection in the Capitol Building in Washington, D.C., one of the two statues there from Idaho. It was dedicated in 1910. The work cost $7,500 and was unveiled in Washington on January 15, 1910.

== See also ==
- 1910 in art
