= Pioneer Cemetery, Boise =

Cemetery in Boise, Ada County, Idaho, US

Pioneer Cemetery

Details
- Established: 1863
- Location: 460 E. Warm Springs Ave., Boise, Ada County, Idaho
- Country: United States
- Coordinates: 43°36′39″N 116°11′22″W
- No. of graves: 1,796 marked graves
- Website: Official website
- Find a Grave: Pioneer Cemetery

Pioneer Cemetery in Boise is one of the oldest burial places in the state of Idaho. In continuous use since 1863, it is the resting place of 11 mayors, eight local county sheriffs, and several governors. Located north of Warm Springs Avenue, the cemetery was rededicated following a refurbishment in 1990.

== History ==
The pioneer cemetery was located on a branch of the Oregon Trail. The oldest legible grave marker in Pioneer Cemetery belongs to Carrie Logan, who died on August 22, 1864, only weeks before her sixth birthday. The cemetery has 1,796 marked graves, and contains many more that are unmarked.

== Notable interments ==
The cemetery is the resting place of the first governor of Idaho, George L. Shoup, a cavalry officer in the Civil War. The other former governors buried there include territorial governor Edward A. Stevenson, as well as state governors Frank W. Hunt, Robert E. Smylie, and Cecil D. Andrus.

The cemetery also contains a memorial to the fallen men of the American Civil War which was erected on May 30, 1896, by Phil Sheridan Women's Relief Corps. It cost $137 and was unveiled on May 9, 1896.
