= 1894 Idaho gubernatorial election =

- November 6, 1894
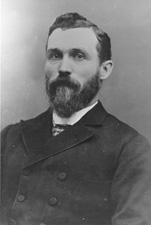

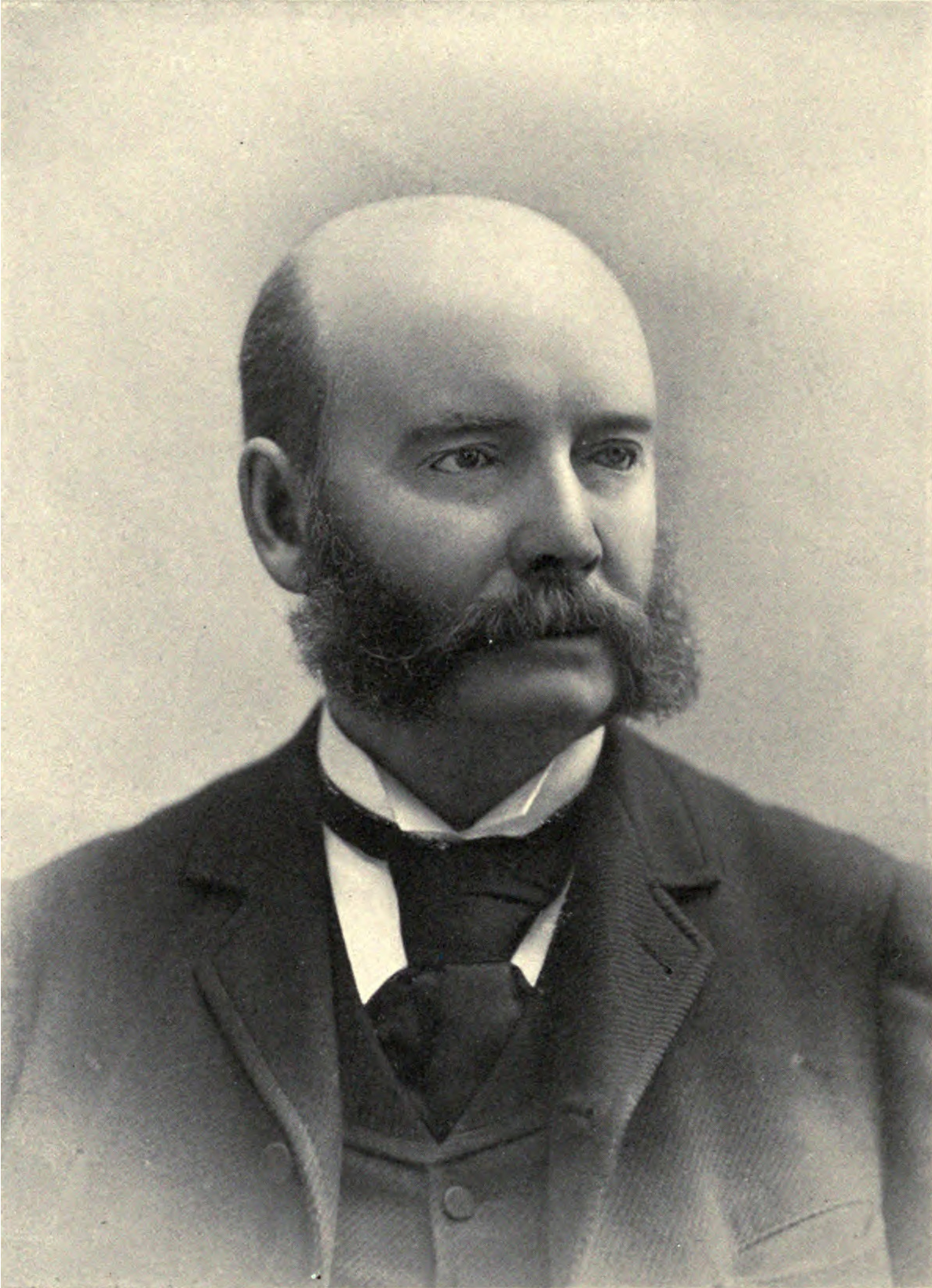

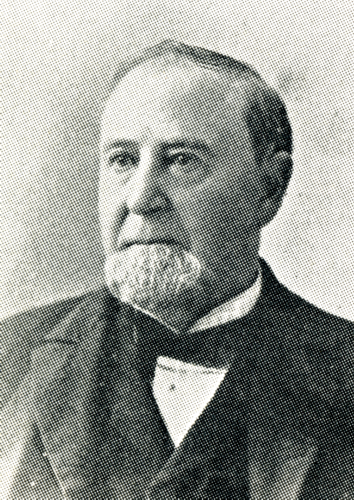
Nominee	William J. McConnell	James W. Ballantine	Edward A. Stevenson
Party	Republican	Populist	Democratic
Popular vote	10,208	7,121	7,057
Percentage	41.51%	28.96%	28.70%
- Results by county McConnell: 30–40% 40–50% 50–60% Ballatine: 40–50% 50–60% Stevenson: 30–40% 40–50%
Governor before election
William J. McConnell
Republican
Elected Governor
William J. McConnell
Republican

The 1894 Idaho gubernatorial election was held on November 6, 1894. Incumbent Republican William J. McConnell defeated People's Party nominee James W. Ballantine with 41.51% of the vote.

== General election ==
=== Candidates ===
Major party candidates

- Edward A. Stevenson, Democratic
- William J. McConnell, Republican

Other candidates

- James W. Ballantine, People's
- Mary C. Johnson, Prohibition

=== Results ===
1894 Idaho gubernatorial election
Party	Candidate	Votes	%	±%
Republican	William J. McConnell (incumbent)	10,208	41.51%	+0.77%
Populist	James W. Ballantine	7,121	28.96%	+4.73%
Democratic	Edward A. Stevenson	7,057	28.70%	−5.02%
Prohibition	Henry C. McFarland	205	0.83%	−0.49%
Majority		3,087		
Turnout				
Republican hold		Swing		
