= Benjamin Victor (sculptor) =

American sculptor

- Born: 16 January 1979 (age 47); Bakersfield, California, United States
- Education: Northern State University
- Known for: Sculpture
- Website: benjaminvictor.com

Benjamin Matthew Victor (b. Taft, California, January 16, 1979) is an American sculptor living and working in Boise, Idaho. He is the only living artist to have three works in the National Statuary Hall in the United States Capitol. He has also created a fourth statue for the Statuary Hall, of Daisy Bates. He was only 26 years old when his first statue, Sarah Winnemucca, a Paiute activist in Nevada, was dedicated in the Hall in 2005, making him the youngest artist to ever be represented in the Hall. In 2014, his sculpture of Norman Borlaug, "the father of the Green Revolution," was dedicated in the National Statuary Hall and in 2019, his statue of Chief Standing Bear, a Native American rights leader, was dedicated in the National Statuary Hall making him the only living artist to have three sculptures in the Hall.

== Early life ==
Benjamin Matthew Victor was born in 1979 in Taft, California. He grew up in Bakersfield. After completing high school, he lived in for a time in Las Vegas, Nevada. He attended Northern State University in Aberdeen, South Dakota, studying art and sculpture.

== Career ==
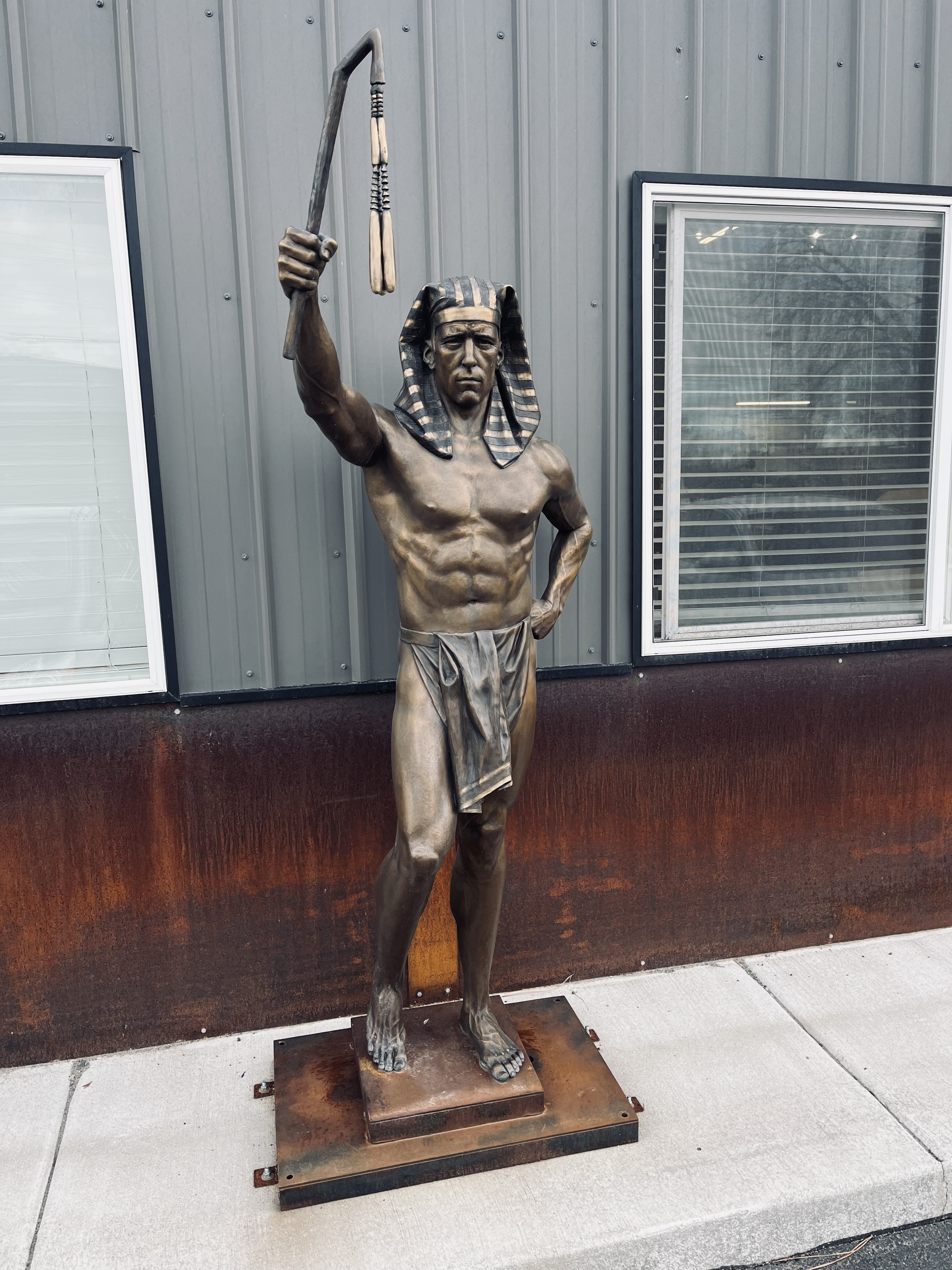
Statue of a pharaoh created by Benjamin Victor

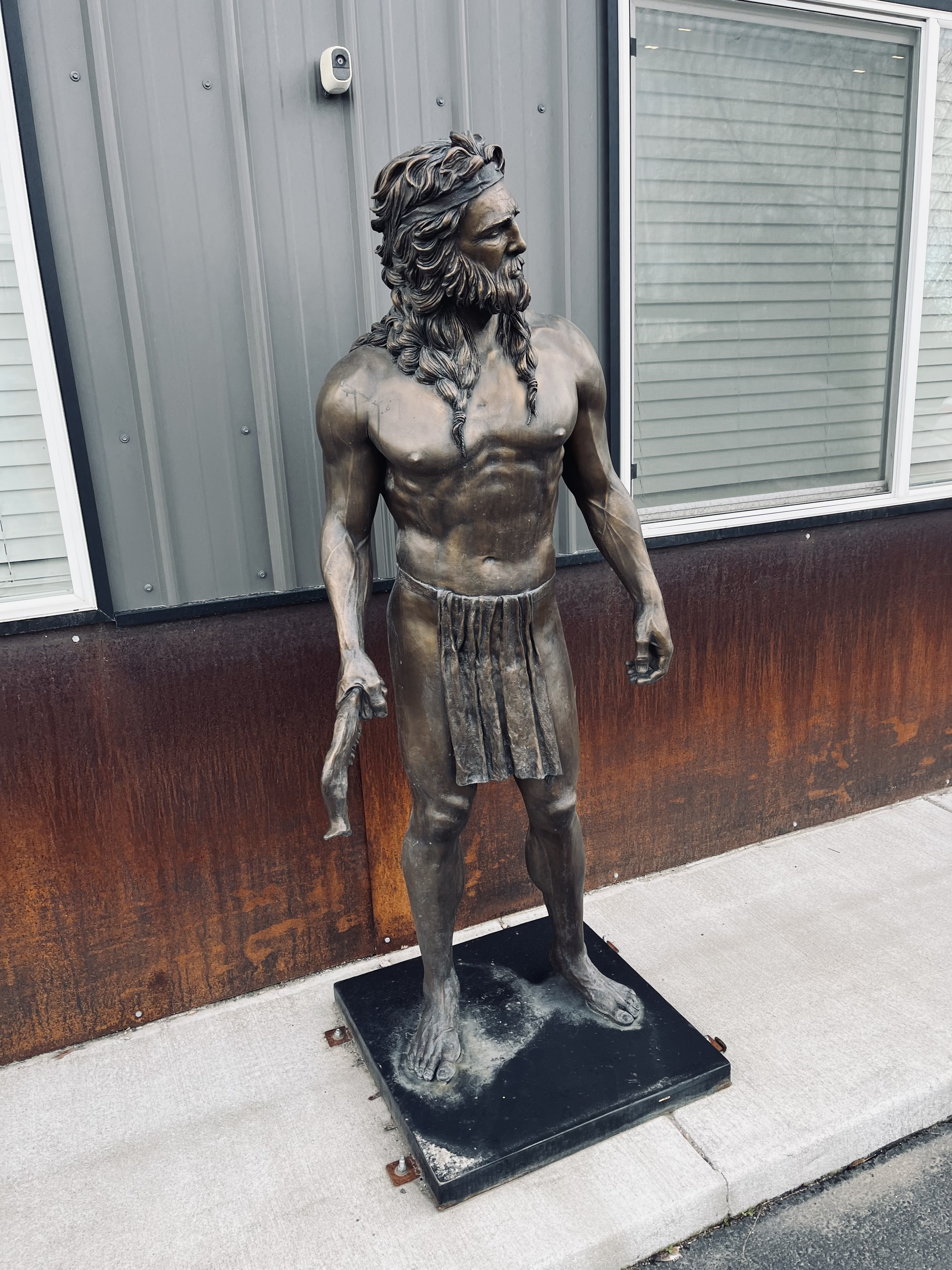
Statue of a man by Victor

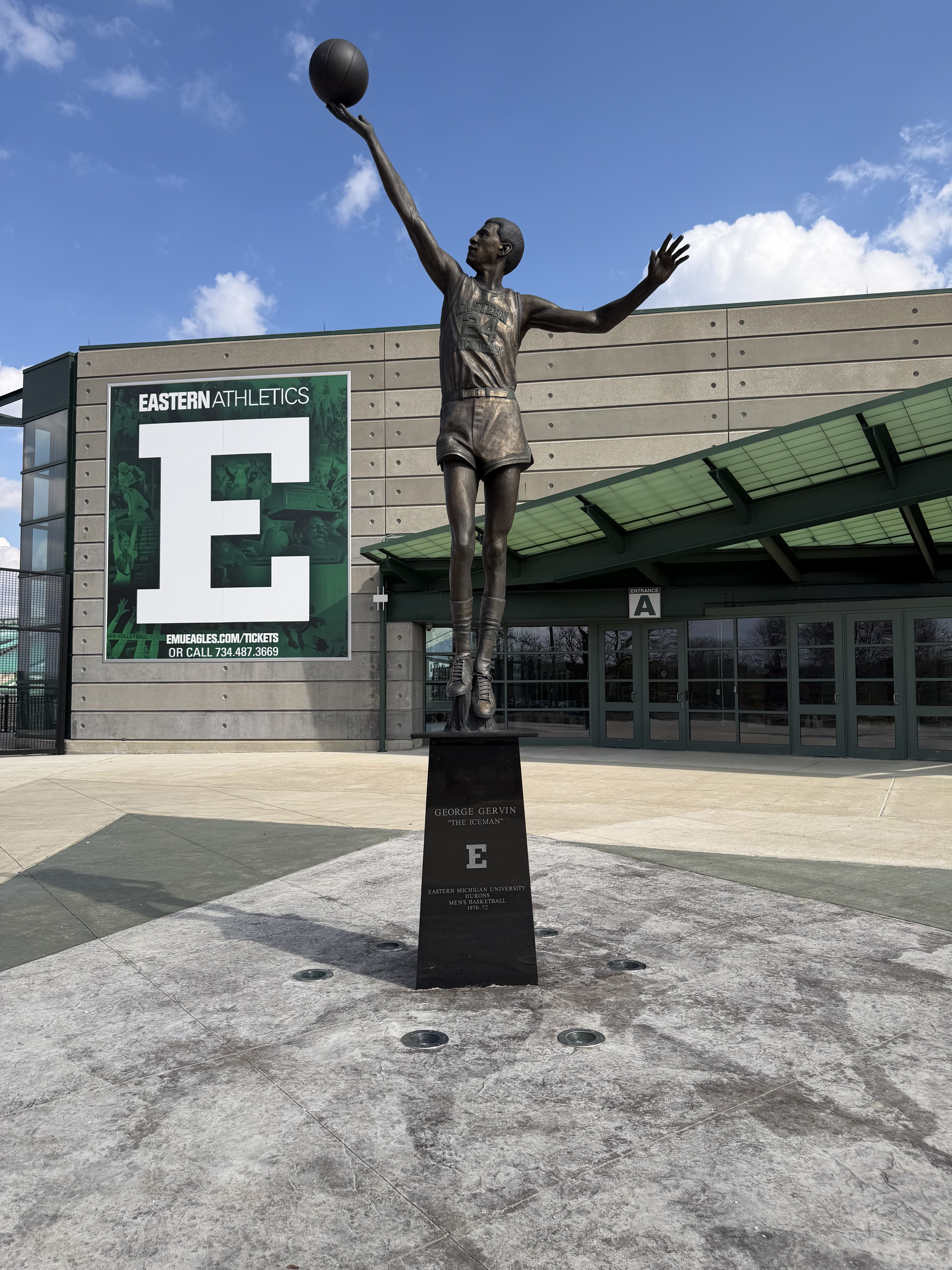
Statue of George Gervin built for Eastern Michigan University

Victor's first work to receive attention was a life-size statue of the biblical character Samson, sculpted when the artist was a sophomore art major at Northern State University. The piece earned Victor a scholarship "in recognition of his aesthetic and conceptual integrity" from the prestigious National Sculpture Society in New York City. At age 23, Victor was commissioned to produce his proposal of a trio of soldiers for the Aberdeen Regional Airport War Memorial in South Dakota.

Victor has completed numerous commissions from city, institutions and non-profits for public artworks throughout the West and upper Midwest, often to commemorate individuals or groups. He was commissioned by the state of Nevada to make sculptures of Sarah Winnemucca, a 19th-century Paiute activist, one for installation in 2005 at its capitol and one to be installed as one of Nevada's official works in the United States Statuary Hall in the United States Capitol Building, Washington, D.C. At age 26, Victor was the youngest sculptor to have a work installed at the hall.

In 2016, Judi M. gaiashkibos, executive director of the Nebraska Commission on Indian Affairs, contacted Victor about creating a statue of Standing Bear (Ponca) for the Centennial Mall at the University of Nebraska–Lincoln. It was installed in 2017. When gaiashkibos learned of a plan replace the two statues allotted for Nebraska in the National Statuary Hall in Washington, D. C., she contacted Victor again to make another sculpture of Standing Bear. The installation of the statue in Statuary Hall was held in 2019, with gaiashkibos's daughter, Katie Brossy in attendance. Using the surplus funds from those raised to erect the Standing Bear statues, gaiashkibos hired Victor in 2021 to sculpt Susan La Flesche Picotte (Omaha), the first Native woman to be licensed as a physician in the US for the Centennial Mall at the university.

=== Notable works ===
- Aberdeen Monument to Firefighters, Aberdeen Fire Department, Station #1, Aberdeen, South Dakota
- Aberdeen War Memorial, Aberdeen Regional Airport, Aberdeen, South Dakota
- Answering the Call, Tempe Beach Park, Tempe, Arizona
- Belle Babb Mansfield, monument to the First Female Attorney, Iowa Wesleyan College, Iowa
- Bob Hoover, Smithsonian Air & Space Museum, Washington, DC
- Cecil Harris, Northern State University, Aberdeen, South Dakota
- Chief Standing Bear, Centennial Mall, Lincoln, Nebraska
- Coach Jim Valvano, North Carolina State Reynolds Coliseum, Raleigh, North Carolina
- Christa McAuliffee, New Hampshire State House, Concord, New Hampshire.
- Coach Everett Case, North Carolina State Reynolds Coliseum, Raleigh, North Carolina
- Community, Wells Avenue, Reno, Nevada
- Delilah, Avenue of the Arts, Gillette, Wyoming
- Dr. Norman E Borlaug, National Statuary Hall, Washington, DC
- Dr. Susan LaFlesche Picotte, Centennial Mall, Lincoln, Nebraska
- Falls Past and Falls Today, Gateway to the Falls, Sioux Falls, South Dakota
- Gretchen Fraser, Olympic Women's Monument, Sun Valley, Idaho
- Independence, S. Wells Avenue and Roberts Street, Reno, Nevada
- Kansas State Monument to Firefighters, Kansas State Capitol Building, Topeka, Kansas
- Lyle Smith, Albertsons Stadium, Boise State University, Boise, Idaho
- Make a Wish Boy and Girl, Make a Wish Building, Sioux Falls, South Dakota
- Monument to 1st Battalion 1st Marines, Castaways Park, Newport Beach, California
- Monument to Firefighters, Fire Station #5, Lawrence, Kansas
- Monument to WWII Airmen, Boise Airport, Boise, Idaho
- Portrait of Terry Redlin, Redlin Art Center, Redlin, South Dakota
- ReTrac Corridor Sculpture Project, ReTrac Corridor, Reno, Nevada
- Robert the Bruce, Private Collection, Linlithgow, Scotland
- Samson, Atlanta, Georgia
- Samson the Mighty, Avenue of the Arts, Gillette, Wyoming
- Sarah Winnemucca, U.S. National Statuary Hall, Washington, D.C. and Nevada State Capitol Building, Carson City, Nevada
- Senator Richard Bryan, University of Nevada, Reno, Nevada
- Sequoyah, Private Collection, Oklahoma City, Oklahoma
- Taft Oilworker Monument, Taft, CA
- The Seasons, United Clinic, Aberdeen, South Dakota
- War Memorial Sculpture, Aberdeen Regional Airport, South Dakota
- Where Cultures Meet, California State University - Dominguez Hills, Carson, California
- Alexander Hamilton, United States Coast Guard Academy, New London, CT (Gift by the Class of '63)
