= Edward A. Stevenson =

American politician

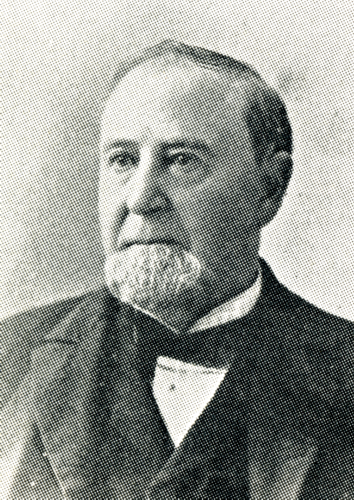

11th Governor of Idaho Territory
- In office October 10, 1885 – April 30, 1889
- Nominated by: Grover Cleveland
- Preceded by: William M. Bunn
- Succeeded by: George L. Shoup

Personal details
- Born: June 15, 1831 Lowville, New York
- Died: July 6, 1895 (aged 64) Monterey County, California
- Party: Democratic
- Spouse(s): Harriet Marcy (1855–9); Anna D. Orr (1860)

Edward Augustus Stevenson (June 15, 1831 – July 6, 1895) was an American politician who was Governor of the Idaho Territory from 1885 to 1889. Stevenson was the first resident of Idaho Territory appointed to the position and the only Democrat to hold the office.

Stevenson's political career began in California where he held a variety of political positions including Speaker pro Tempore of the California State Legislature. After moving to Idaho Territory he remained active in politics until his appointment as governor. As governor, Stevenson exerted most of his efforts lobbying for the territory to be granted statehood.

== Early life ==
Stevenson was born June 15, 1831, in Lowville, New York. (Note: Some sources list Phelps, New York instead of Lowville as the place of Stevenson's birth.) His family included several future politician, including his brother Charles, who became the fifth governor of Nevada, his half brother John, who became the first Speaker of the Legislative Assembly of Ontario, and his cousin Adlai, who became Vice President of the United States. In 1839, his family lived in Canada for a short time before settling on a farm in Washtenaw County, Michigan. Stevenson received an education there, first in the local schools and then at Grass Lake Academy.

== California ==
Stevenson left home in 1849 as part of the California Gold Rush. He soon became involved in politics, being elected Justice of the Peace for El Dorado County and to the California State Legislature in 1853 and 1854.

Stevenson married Harriet Marcy on June 10, 1855. The marriage would produce three children: Frank, Harriet, and Wilmot. The year after the wedding, the couple moved to a farm in Tehama County. Stevenson worked as an Indian agent for two years before his wife and children were killed by the Indians while he was away on official business.

Following this loss, Stevenson was again elected for terms in the California State Legislature in 1859 and 1860. Other positions of influence include his election as Speaker pro Tempore during his time as a legislator and his selection as deputy sheriff and Mayor of Coloma, California.

Stevenson remarried in November 1860. His marriage to Anna D. Orr produced a son, Charles C., who would become City Attorney for Boise, Idaho.

== Idaho ==
Stevenson moved to Idaho Territory in 1863 during the Idaho gold rush. He settled in the Boise Basin and soon acquired mining interests near Grimes Pass, Idaho. The next year he reentered politics by becoming Justice of the Peace. This was followed by 6 election runs for the territorial legislature, three successful and three unsuccessful. As result of his campaigns in 1866 and 1876 he served a pair of two-year terms on the Council, while his election campaign in 1874 resulted in him becoming Speaker of the House of Representatives.

In 1876, while also serving as a member of the Boise County Commission, he began reading law and was admitted to the bar two years later. In 1882 he moved to the Payette Valley and shifted his business interests from mining to farming.

== Governorship ==
Based upon a recommendation from Territorial Delegate John Hailey, Stevenson was nominated to become Governor of Idaho Territory by Grover Cleveland on September 29, 1885. Following confirmation, his term of office began on October 10, 1885. By this time, Stevenson was associated with the territory's agricultural interests and his nomination represented a change of national policy allowing for more local control within the territory. He was Idaho Territory's only Democratic governor and the first governor who resided within the territory at time of appointment.

Stevenson emphasized non-partisanship upon assuming office. He lobbied for expansion of the territory's mail routes and the size of the militia. Stevenson also opposed the burning of large sections of forest by the territory's Indian population along with other wasteful uses of natural resources. The new governor also lobbied for increases to the federally imposed limits to the territorial government's budget.

While Stevenson softened the anti-Mormon stance of his predecessors, his administration took a noticeably anti-Chinese stance. Chinese workers, who had immigrated to the United States during the 1850s and 1860s, were seen as a threat to the economic welfare of Anglo workers. The issue came to a head in 1885 when five Chinese merchants were hanged as murderers in Pierce City. The Chinese Minister to the United States called for the incident to be fully investigated. Stevenson responded by decreeing the hung men had been guilty and had brought about incident with their "filthy habits". The governor also called for the deportation and exclusion of all Chinese from the territory.

Despite these incidents, the primary emphasis of Stevenson's administration was lobbying for expanded national representation and influence for the territory. He initially called for changes to Idaho's Organic Act that would allow the governor more control over territorial appointments and grant residents "the privilege and right of voting in the election of President and Vice President of the united States". This effort changed in 1889 when Stevenson abandoned territorial reform efforts and instead began lobbying for statehood. The first problem he faced in this effort was a call by Idaho's northern counties to be joined to either western Montana or eastern Washington in a new territory. At the same time, Nevada was looking to annex the territory's southern counties. These efforts were looked upon favorably in the U.S. Congress, but through his friendship with President Cleveland, Stevenson was able to block the changes from occurring.

Following the inauguration of Benjamin Harrison as President of the United States, Stevenson's days as governor came to an end, with Republican candidates lobbying to replace the Democratic governor. Stevenson's successor, George L. Shoup, was sworn in on April 30, 1889.

== Later life ==
After his term as territorial governor, Stevenson moved back to his farm. In addition to his farming activities, he won the contract for a profitable mail run. In 1894, he ran unsuccessfully for state governor. The strains of the campaign proved deleterious to Stevenson's health, and he moved to Paraiso Springs in Monterey County, California, in an effort to recover. The former governor died there on July 6, 1895, from a laudanum overdose and was buried at the in Boise Pioneer Cemetery.

== Footnotes ==
Party political offices
Preceded by John M. Burke	Democratic Party nominee, Governor of Idaho; 1894	Succeeded by Frank Steunenberg
