= The House of Representatives =

Painting by Samuel Morse

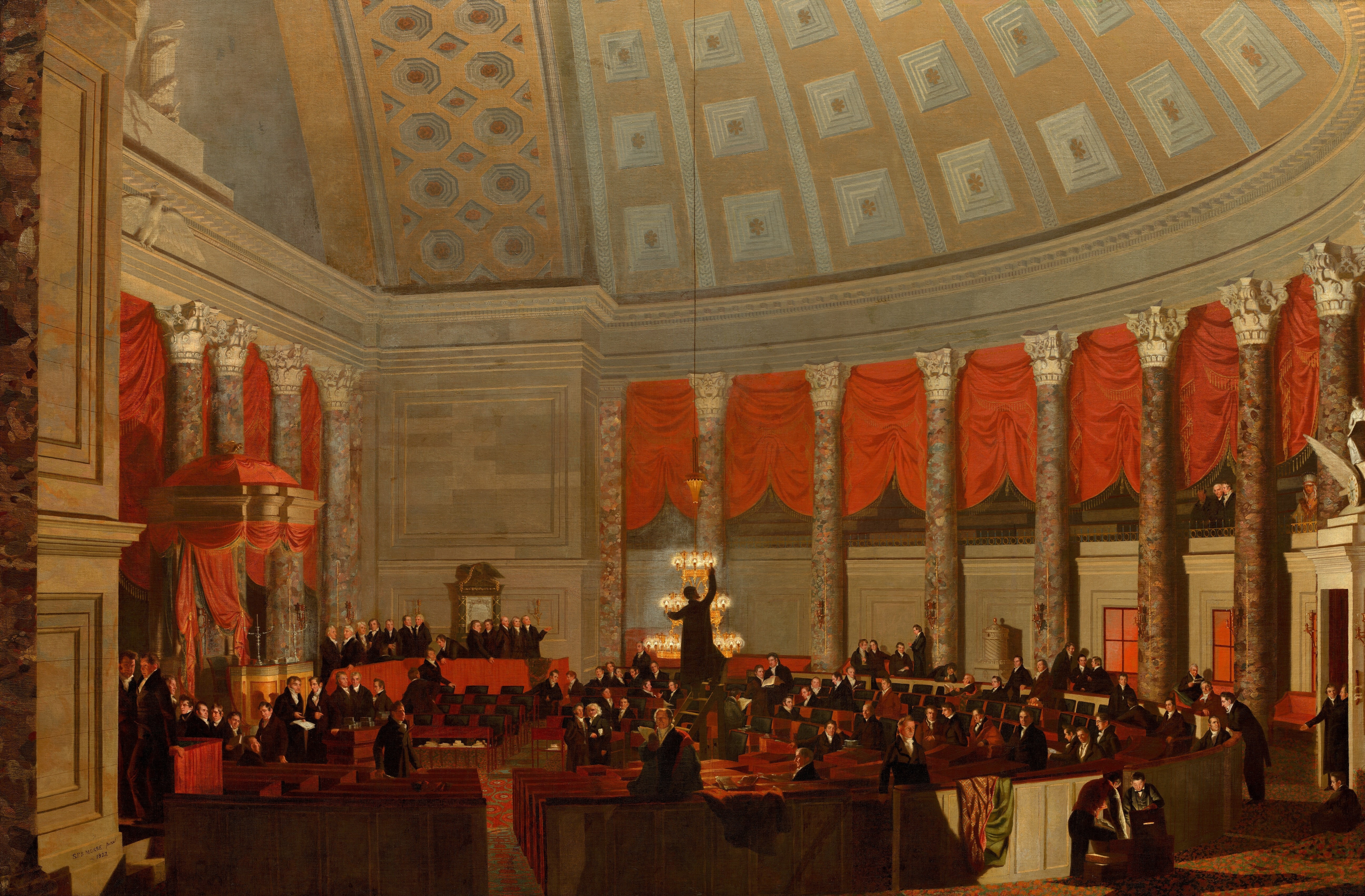
- Artist: Samuel Morse
- Year: 1822
- Type: Oil on canvas, history painting
- Dimensions: 220.7 cm × 331.8 cm (86.9 in × 130.6 in)
- Location: National Gallery of Art, Washington

The House of Representatives is an 1822 history painting by the American artist Samuel Morse. It depicts a session of the United States House of Representatives, in a chamber designed by Benjamin Henry Latrobe, now the National Statuary Hall.

Morse, known as an inventor as well as a painter, had spent several years in England studying before returning home in 1815 following the War of 1812. He captures the scene during the Era of Good Feelings. In 1823 Morse exhibited the painting in several cities, drawing critical praise but making little money from public admissions. Today it is in the National Gallery of Art in Washington.

== Bibliography ==
- Dearinger, David. Paintings and Sculpture in the Collection of the National Academy of Design: 1826-1925. Hudson Hills, 2004.
- Kelley, Robert Lloyd. The Shaping of the American Past: To 1877. Prentice-Hall, 1982.
- Kreingold, Paul. Potomac Marble: History of the Search for the Ideal Stone. Arcadia Publishing, 2023.
- Snow, Peter. When Britain Burned the White House: The 1814 Invasion of Washington. Hachette UK, 2013.
