= Statue of Sarah Winnemucca =

Statue by Benjamin Victor

Sarah Winnemucca
- Artist: Benjamin Victor
- Year: 2005
- Medium: Bronze sculpture
- Subject: Sarah Winnemucca
- Location: Washington, D.C., United States

Sarah Winnemucca is a bronze sculpture depicting the Northern Paiute author, activist and educator by Benjamin Victor, installed in the United States Capitol Visitor Center's Emancipation Hall, in Washington, D.C., as part of the National Statuary Hall Collection. The statue was gifted by the U.S. state of Nevada in 2005.

== See also ==
- 2005 in art
