= Statue of Norman Borlaug =

Statue in the U.S. Capitol

Norman Borlaug
- The statue at the National Statuary Hall, 2023
- Artist: Benjamin Victor
- Year: 2014
- Medium: Bronze sculpture
- Subject: Norman Borlaug
- Location: Washington, D.C., United States

Norman Borlaug, or Dr. Norman E. Borlaug, is a bronze sculpture depicting the American agronomist and humanitarian of the same name by Benjamin Victor, installed in the United States Capitol's National Statuary Hall, in Washington, D.C., as part of the National Statuary Hall Collection. The statue was gifted by the U.S. state of Iowa in 2014, replacing a statue of James Harlan which the state had gifted in 1910.

== See also ==
- 2014 in art
