= George L. Shoup =

American politician (1836–1904)

George Shoup
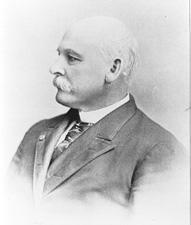

United States Senator from Idaho
- In office December 18, 1890 – March 3, 1901
- Succeeded by: Fred Dubois

1st Governor of Idaho
- In office July 3, 1890 – December 18, 1890
- Lieutenant: N. B. Willey
- Preceded by: Himself (as Governor of Idaho Territory)
- Succeeded by: N. B. Willey

12th Governor of Idaho Territory
- In office April 30, 1889 – July 3, 1890
- President: Benjamin Harrison
- Preceded by: Edward A. Stevenson
- Succeeded by: Himself (as Governor of Idaho)

Personal details
- Born: June 15, 1836 Kittanning, Pennsylvania, U.S.
- Died: December 21, 1904 (aged 68) Boise, Idaho, U.S.
- Resting place: Pioneer Cemetery, Boise
- Party: Republican
- Spouse(s): Magdalena "Lena" Darnutzer Shoup (1844–1927) (m. 1868–1904, his death)
- Children: 6

Military service
- Allegiance: Union
- Branch/service: Union Army
- Years of service: 1861–1864
- Rank: Colonel
- Unit: 3rd Colorado Cavalry Regiment
- Battles/wars: American Civil War; Indian Wars

George Laird Shoup (June 15, 1836 – December 21, 1904) was an American politician who served as the first governor of Idaho, in addition to its last territorial governor. He served several months after statehood in 1890 and then became one of the state's first United States senators.

== Early life ==
Born in Kittanning, Pennsylvania, northeast of Pittsburgh, Shoup was educated in the public school system. He moved to Galesburg, Illinois, in 1852 and farmed. He married Magdelena "Lena" Darnutzer of Iowa on June 15, 1868, and they had three sons and three daughters, Lena, Laura and Margaret.

== Career ==
After being devastated financially in the Panic of 1857, Shoup moved to Colorado Territory in 1859 to engage in mining and merchandising near Pikes Peak and later in Denver.

During the Civil War, he enlisted with the independent scouts working in New Mexico Territory, Colorado Territory, and Texas. Shoup was commissioned as a second lieutenant when the 3rd Colorado Cavalry Regiment was formed in 1861 and was mustered out as a colonel in December 1864. He took part in the Battle of Apache Canyon in New Mexico Territory during the Civil War and the Sand Creek massacre during the Colorado War.

After the war, Shoup moved to Virginia City, Montana Territory, and then settled across the continental divide in Salmon, a city in Idaho Territory that he helped found. He owned general merchandise stores in both locations. Shoup was appointed commissioner to organize Lemhi County, and in 1874 he was elected to the territorial legislature. With few interruptions, he served on the Republican National Committee for Idaho from 1880 to 1904.

In April 1889, President Benjamin Harrison appointed Shoup governor of Idaho Territory, a position he held until July 1890, when Idaho became a state and Idaho Territory ceased to exist. Shoup was elected the state's first governor in October. He served as governor of the new state for only a few weeks. In November 1890 the Idaho Legislature elected him to the U.S. Senate. Shoup resigned as governor in December to take his Senate seat and was succeeded by lieutenant governor N. B. Willey.

In the U.S. Senate for over a decade, from 1890 to 1901, Shoup had many interests, including pensions, education, and military affairs. He was chairman of the Committee on Territories. In that position he advocated liberal and just treatment of the Native Americans. Shoup was reelected to a full six-year term in the Senate by the state legislature in January 1895, but was defeated in January 1901 by Democrat Fred Dubois, and retired from public life and resided in Boise.

Two years later at age 66, Shoup made a final attempt to return to the U.S. Senate, but bowed out of the four-man race for the Republican nomination in the legislature in January 1903. He gave his support to fellow Pennsylvania native Weldon Heyburn of the Silver Valley, who defeated Boise attorney William Borah for the nomination and Democrat James Hawley of Boise for the seat. Four years later, Borah easily won the other U.S. Senate seat, and served for nearly 33 years.

== Death ==
Shoup died in Boise, Idaho at the age 68 on December 21, 1904, and was given a state funeral in Idaho. He is interred in the Boise Pioneer Cemetery, alongside his wife Lena, who died in Salmon, Idaho in 1927.

== Legacy ==
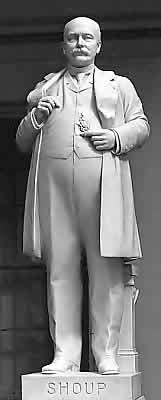
George Shoup (NSHC)

In 1910, the state of Idaho donated a marble statue of Shoup to the National Statuary Hall Collection at the U.S. Capitol. It was joined by a statue of Senator Borah (1865–1940) in 1947.

The unincorporated community of Shoup, Idaho on the Salmon River, northwest and downstream of Salmon, was named for him in 1882. During World War II, a Liberty ship named S.S. George L. Shoup (hull #2004) was launched at the Oregon Shipbuilding Corporation in Portland in May 1943. A new men's dormitory at the University of Idaho in Moscow was named for him in 1958.

Shoup's papers were donated to the University of Idaho, having been gathered by his son William and presented by his grandson, G. Elmo Shoup.

Party political offices
First	Republican nominee for Governor of Idaho; 1890	Succeeded by William J. McConnell
U.S. Senate
Preceded by None	U.S. senator (Class 2) from Idaho; 1890–1901; Served alongside: William J. McConnell, Fred T. Dubois, Henry Heitfeld	Succeeded by Fred T. Dubois
Political offices
Preceded by Office created	Governor of Idaho; 1890	Succeeded by N. B. Willey
