= Frederick Triebel =

American sculptor

Frederick Ernest Triebel
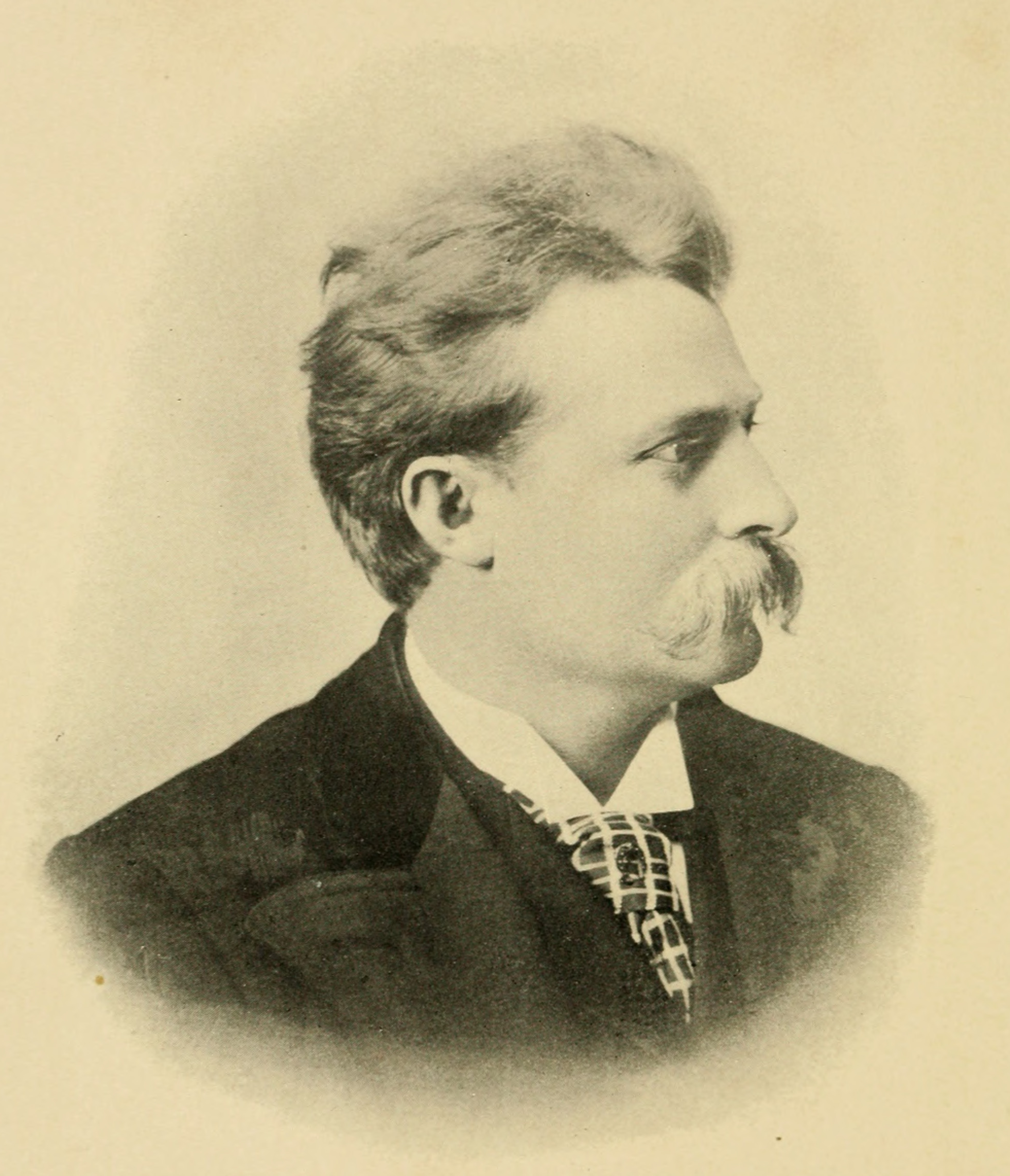
- Born: December 29, 1865; Peoria, Illinois
- Died: September 14, 1944 (aged 79)
- Resting place: Woodlawn Cemetery; 40.8936348°N 73.8726349°W
- Notable work: George Laird Shoup marble statue; Henry Mower Rice marble statue
- Spouse: Santina Grosse
- Father: Otto Triebel

Frederick Ernest "Fritz" Triebel (December 29, 1865 – 1944) was an American sculptor, best remembered for his two works, marble statues of George Laird Shoup and Henry Mower Rice, located in the National Statuary Hall Collection in Washington D.C.

== Early life ==
He was born in Peoria, Illinois on December 29, 1865, where his father was a monument maker. His father Otto had been apprenticed as a stone carver in Germany before immigrating to the United States and it was likely from him that Triebel learned the rudiments of sculpting.

== Career ==
At the age of 16 Triebel was apprenticed to a stone carver in Chicago, and from there he moved to first New York and then Boston. In 1882 he won a scholarship to attend the Royal Academy of Fine Arts in Florence, Italy where he attended and prospered. While there, he married Santina Grosse. Their first two children, Dante and Beatrice were born in Italy. In the early 1890s Triebel was invited to be a part of the international sculpture selection jury for the World's Columbian Exposition. He also exhibited six works at the exposition and sold everything he exhibited.

In 1899, Triebel moved from Italy to New York. He was the first artist to create a studio in MacDougal Alley. He lived in No. 6.

In 1919, he applied for a job as a tracer at the Hog Island shipyard.

== Death ==
Triebel died on September 14, 1944.

== Selected works ==
- Soldiers and Sailors Monument, 1899, Peoria Courthouse
- Regimental and central monuments to Iowa Union soldiers, Shiloh National Military Park, 1906
- Bronze statue of Robert G. Ingersoll, Peoria, Illinois, 1911
- Bronze works featured on the Mississippi State Memorial, Vicksburg National Military Park, Vicksburg, Mississippi, 1912
Gallery of Triebel sculptures
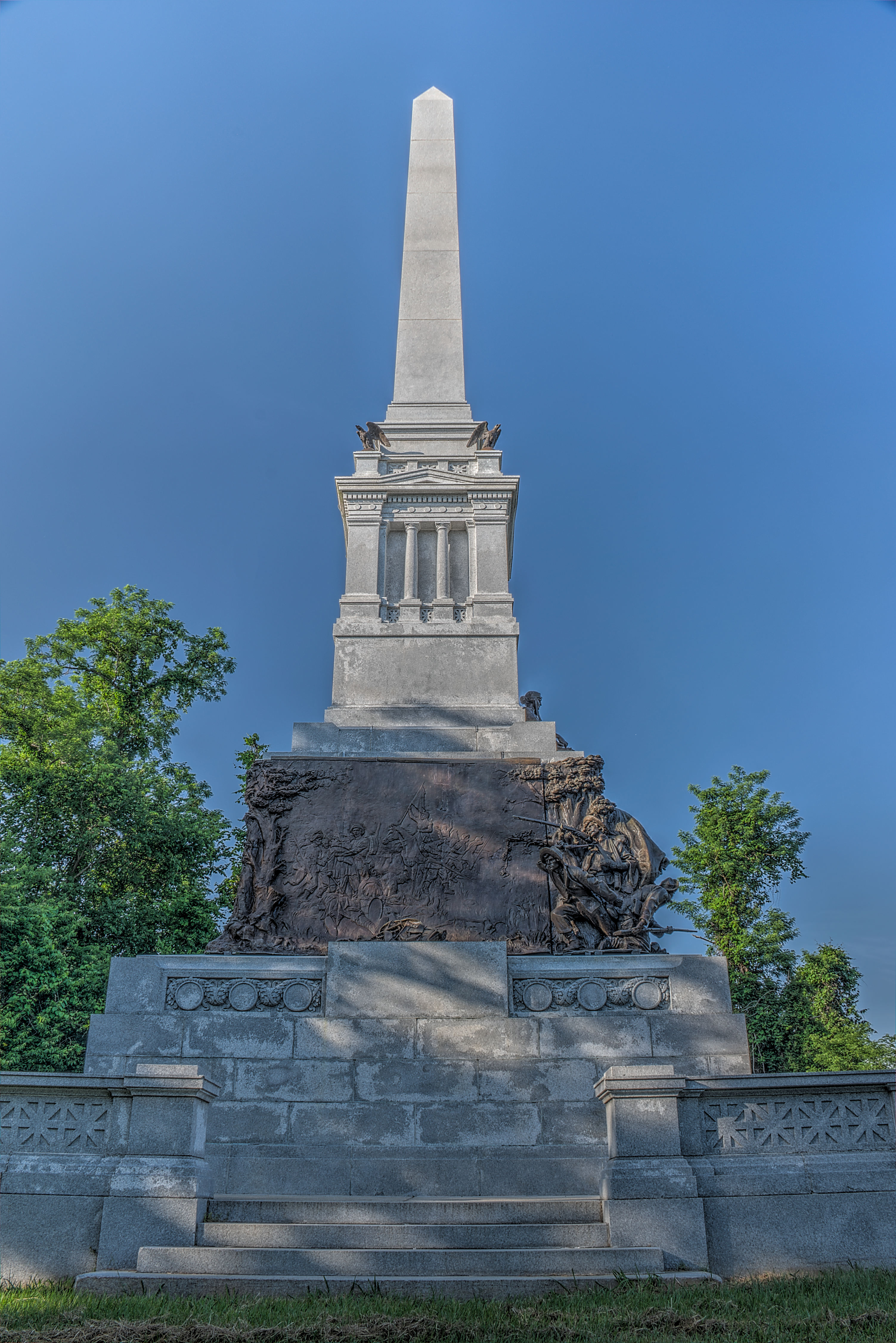
Mississippi State Memorial, Vicksburg National Military Park

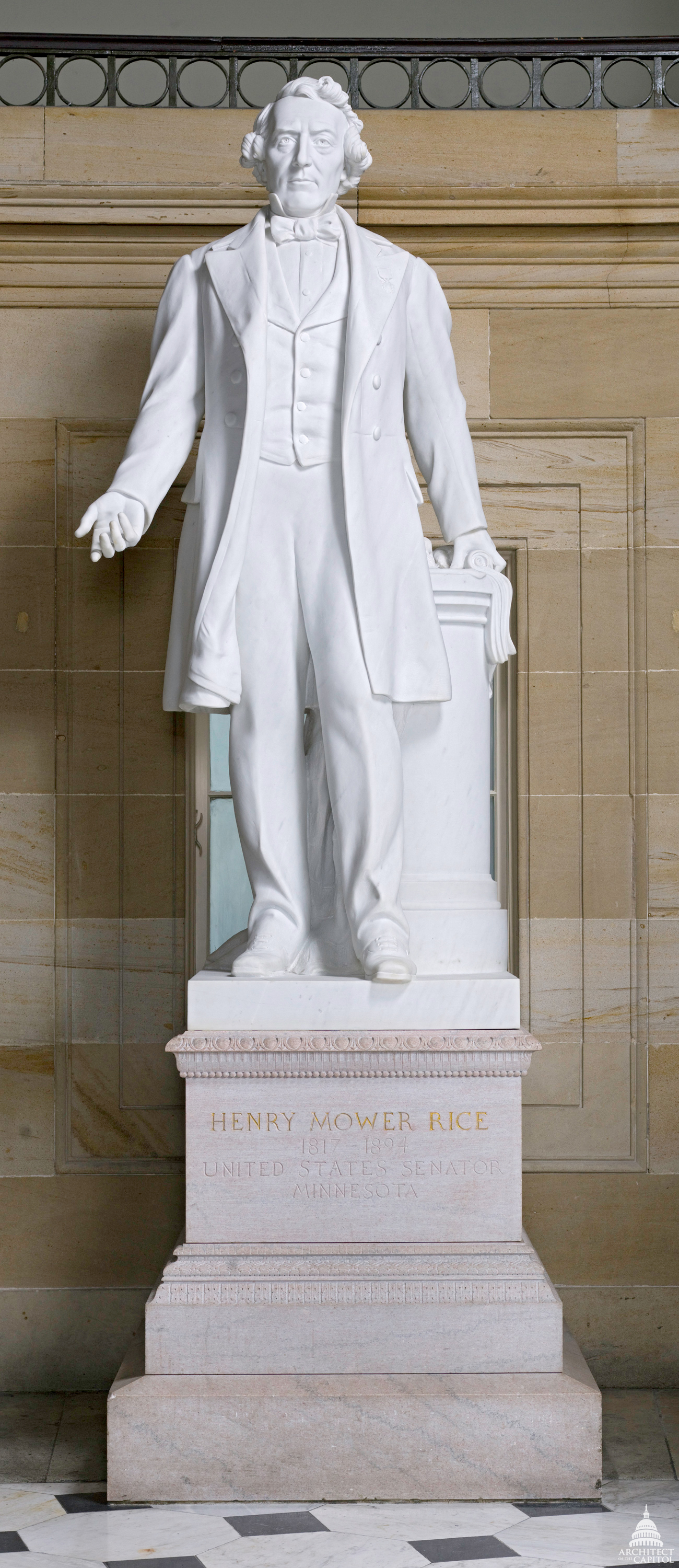
Statue of Henry Mower Rice, National Statuary Hall Collection

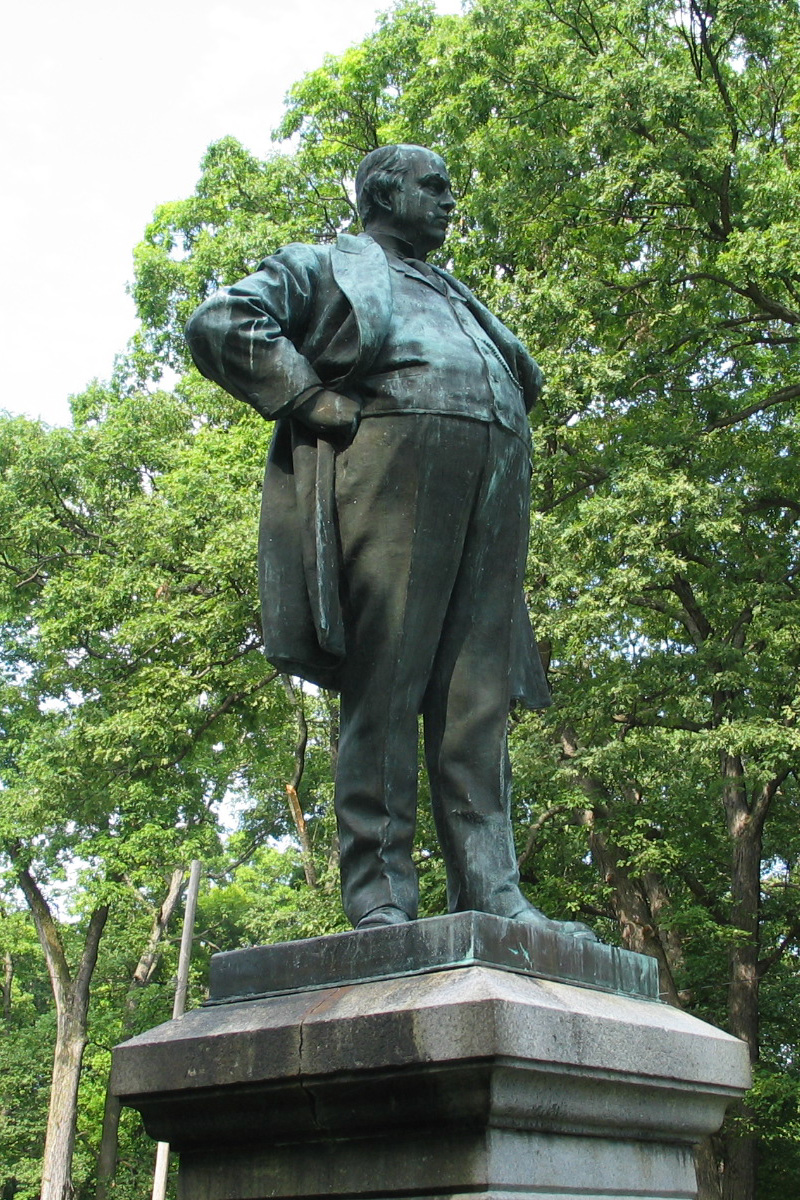
Robert G. Ingersoll statue, Glen Oak Park, Peoria, Illinois

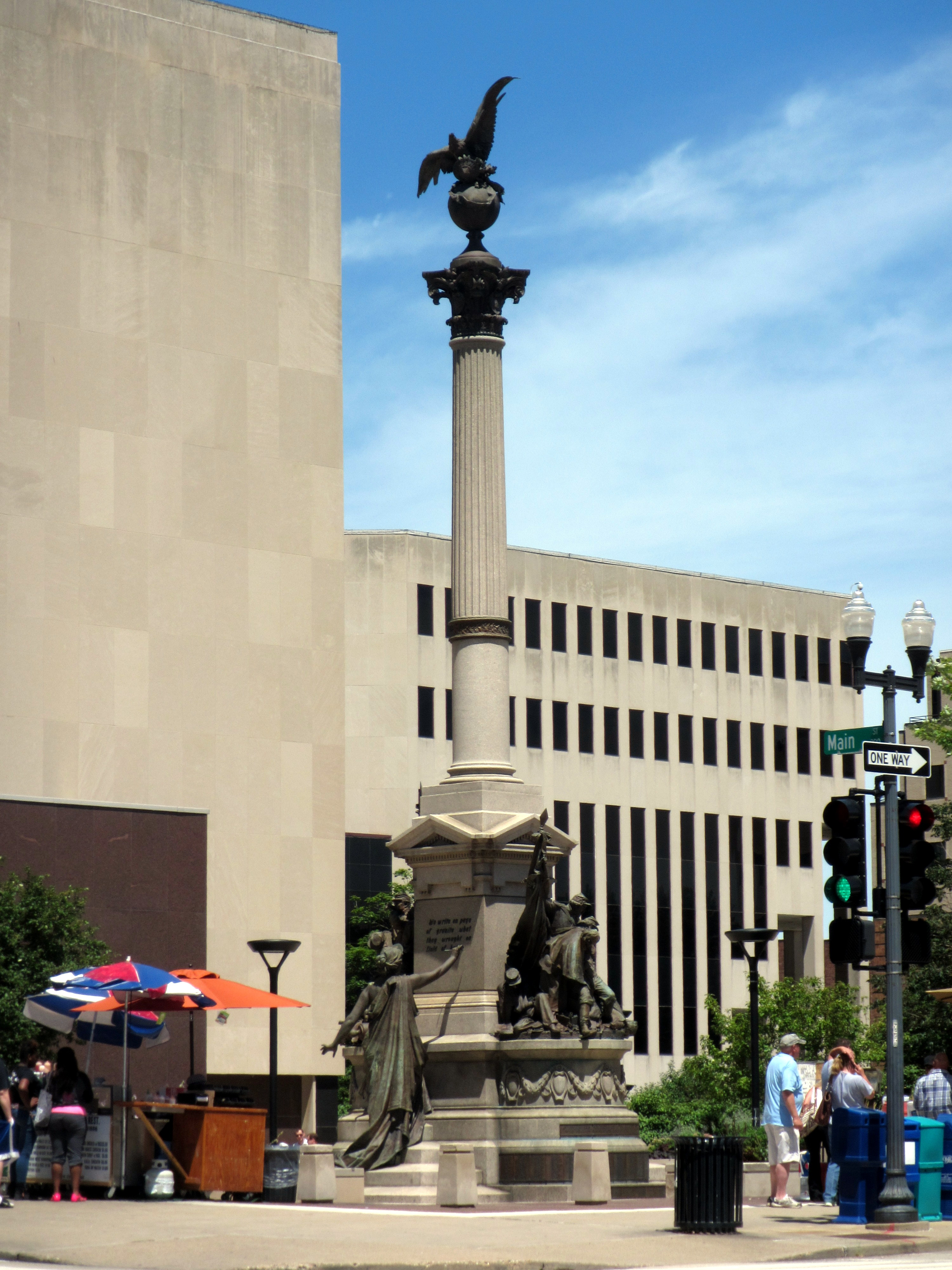
Soldiers and Sailors Monument, Peoria Courthouse Square
