= National Statuary Hall =

Chamber in the United States Capitol

Coordinates: 38.8897°N 77.0091°W

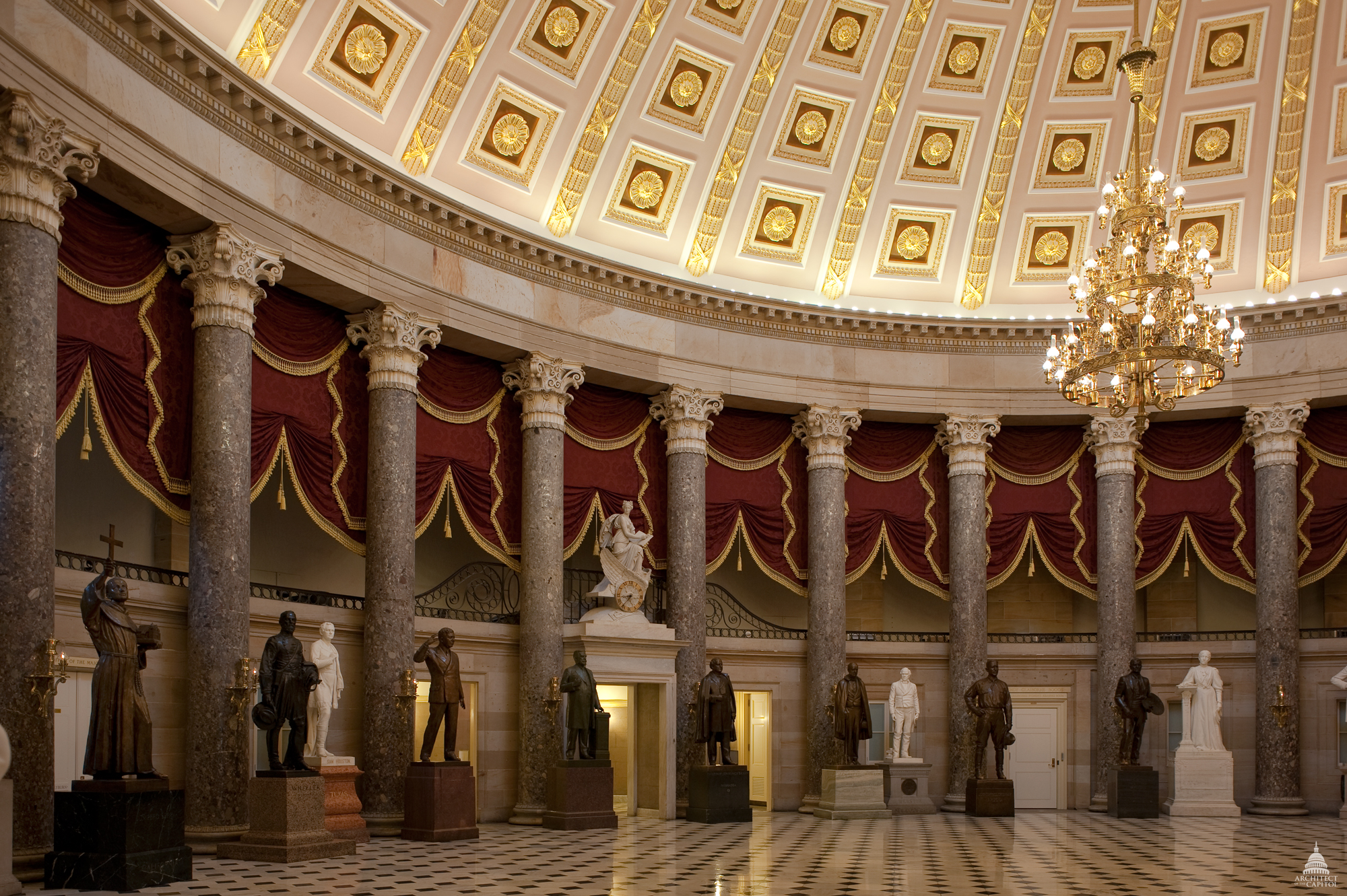
The National Statuary Hall in 2011

The National Statuary Hall is a chamber in the United States Capitol devoted to sculptures of prominent Americans. The hall, also known as the Old Hall of the House, is a large, two-story, semicircular room with a second story gallery along the curved perimeter. It is located immediately south of the Rotunda. The meeting place of the U.S. House of Representatives for nearly 50 years (1807–1857), after a few years of disuse it was repurposed as a statuary hall in 1864; this is when the National Statuary Hall Collection was established. By 1933, the collection had outgrown this single room, and a number of statues are placed elsewhere within the Capitol.

== Description ==
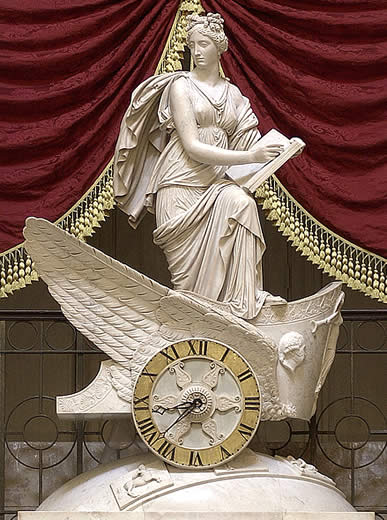
Car of History by Carlo Franzoni (1819)

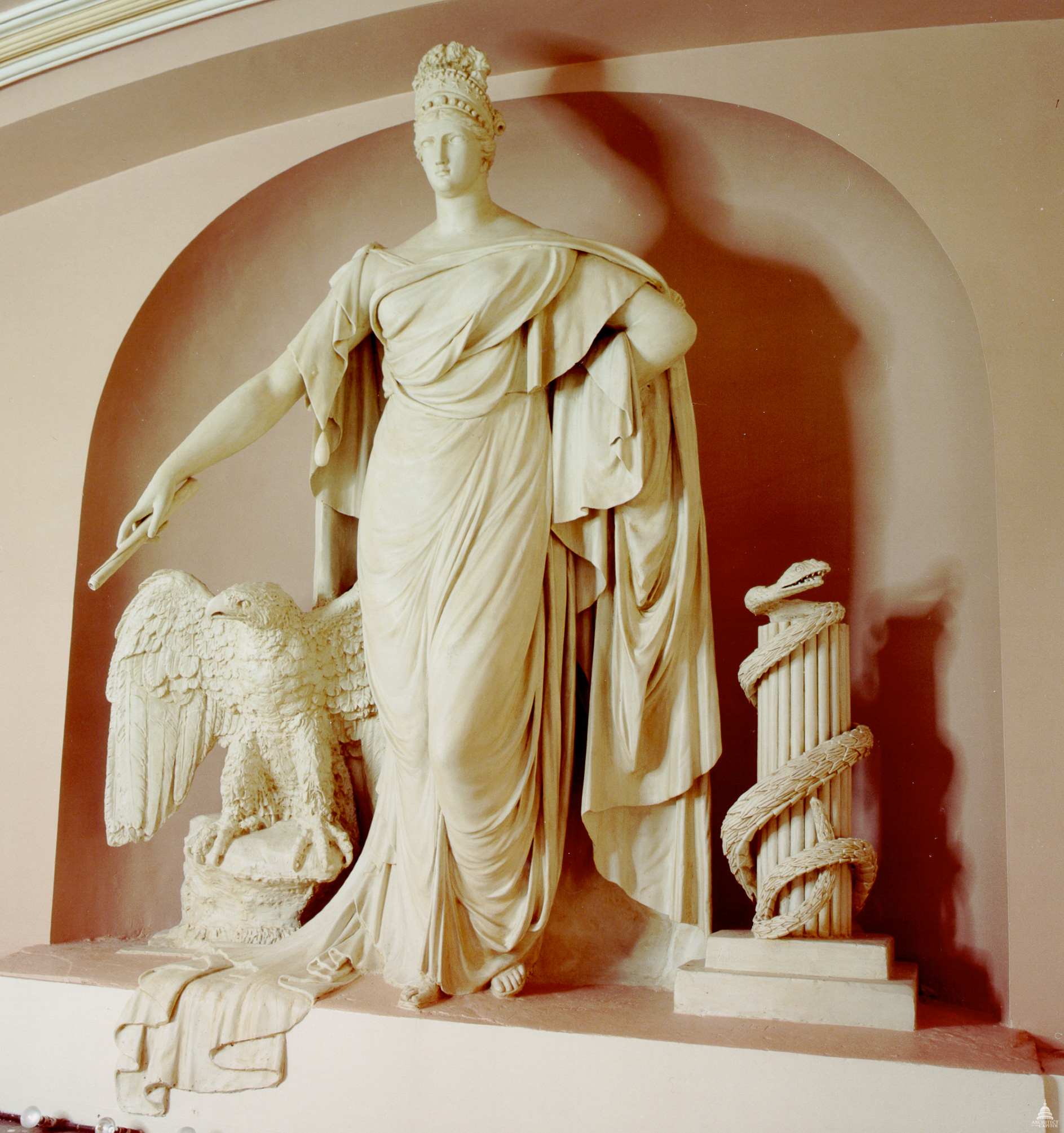
Liberty and the Eagle by Enrico Causici (1819)

The Hall is built in the shape of an ancient amphitheater and is one of the earliest examples of Neoclassical architecture in America. While most wall surfaces are painted plaster, the low gallery walls and pilasters are sandstone. Around the room's perimeter stand colossal columns of variegated breccia marble quarried along the Potomac River. The Corinthian capitals of white marble were carved in Carrara, Italy. A lantern in the fireproof cast-steel ceiling admits natural light into the Hall. The chamber floor is laid with black and white marble tiles; the black marble was purchased specifically for the chamber, while the white marble was scrap material from the Capitol extension project.

Only two of the many statues presently in the room were commissioned for display in the original Hall of the House. Enrico Causici's neoclassical plaster Liberty and the Eagle looks out over the Hall from a niche above the colonnade behind what was once the Speaker's rostrum. The sandstone relief eagle in the frieze of the entablature below was carved by Giuseppe Valaperta. Above the door leading into the Rotunda is the Car of History by Carlo Franzoni. This neoclassical marble sculpture depicts Clio, the Muse of History, riding in the chariot of Time and recording events in the chamber below. The wheel of the chariot contains the chamber clock; the works are by Simon Willard.

== History ==
This chamber is the second hall and third meeting place built for the House of Representatives in this location. Prior to this, the House members met in a squat, oval, temporary building known as "the Oven", which had been hastily erected in 1801. The first permanent Hall, designed by Benjamin Henry Latrobe, was completed in 1807; however, it was destroyed when invading British troops burned the Capitol in August 1814 during the War of 1812. The Hall was rebuilt in its present form by Latrobe and his successor, Charles Bulfinch, between 1815 and 1819. The smooth, curved ceiling promoted annoying echoes, making it difficult to conduct business. Various attempts to improve the acoustics, including hanging draperies and reversing the seating arrangement, proved unsuccessful. The only solution to this problem was to build an entirely new Hall, one in which debates could be easily understood. In 1850, a new Hall was authorized, and the House moved into its present chamber in the new House wing in 1857.

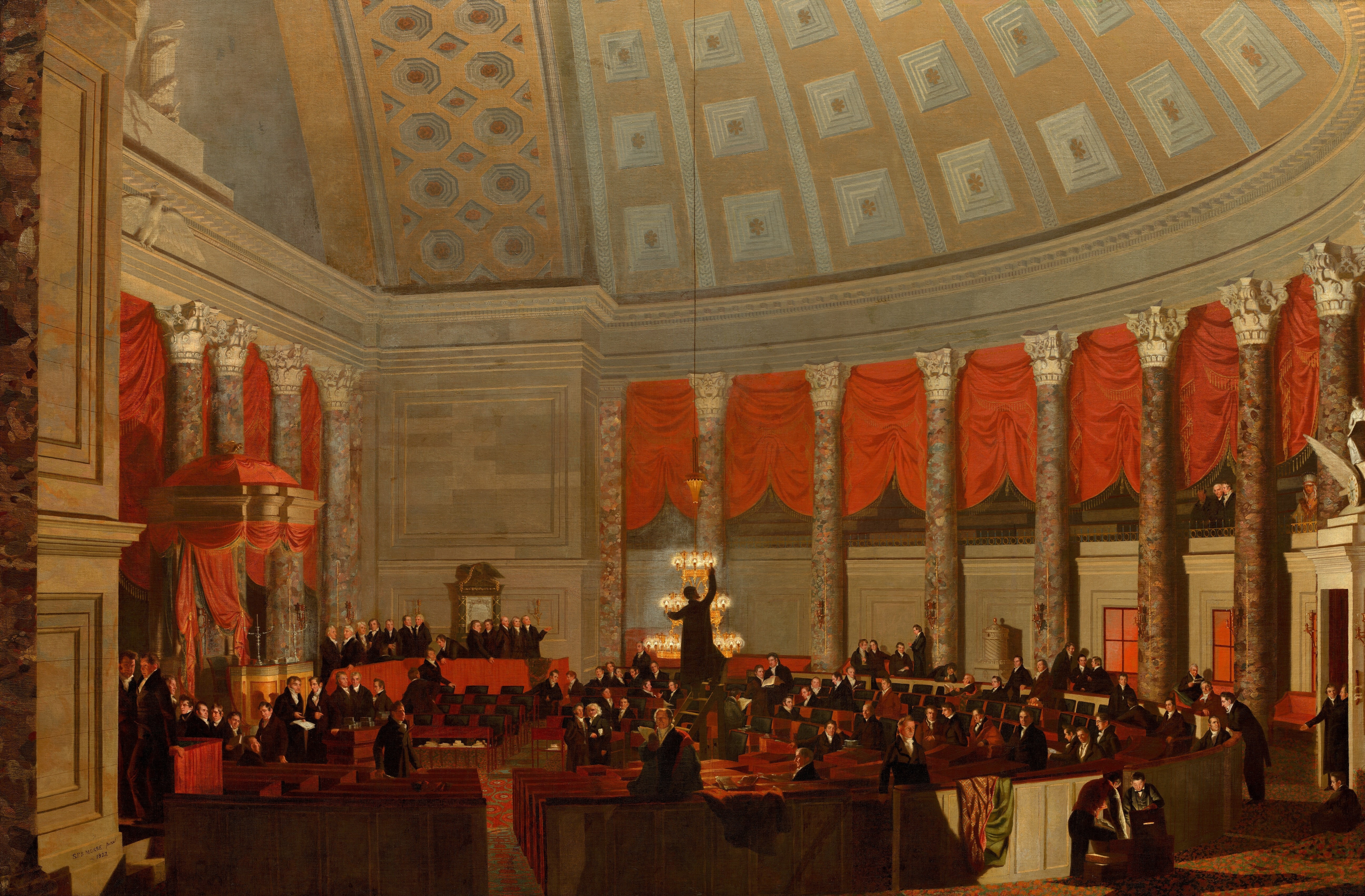
Samuel Morse's 1823 oil painting The House of Representatives depicts a night session of the United States House of Representatives in the old Hall of the House.

Many important events took place in this Chamber while it served as the Hall of the House. It was in this room in 1824 that the Marquis de Lafayette became the first foreign citizen to address Congress. Presidents James Madison, James Monroe, John Quincy Adams, Andrew Jackson, and Millard Fillmore were inaugurated here. John Quincy Adams, in particular, has long been associated with the Chamber. It was here in 1825 that he was elected president by the House of Representatives, none of the candidates having secured a majority of electoral votes. Following his presidency, Adams served as a Member in the Hall for 17 years. He collapsed at his desk from a stroke on February 21, 1848, and died two days later in the adjoining office, at the time, of the Speaker of the House.

The fate of the vacated Hall remained uncertain for many years, although various proposals were put forth for its use. Perhaps the simplest was that it be converted into additional space for the Library of Congress, which was still housed in the Capitol. More drastic was the suggestion that the entire Hall be dismantled and replaced by two floors of committee rooms. Eventually, the idea of using the chamber as an art gallery was approved, and works intended for the Capitol extensions were put on exhibit; among these was the plaster model for the Statue of Freedom, which was later cast in bronze for the Capitol dome. The lack of wall space effectively prevented the hanging of large paintings, but the room seemed well suited to the display of statuary.

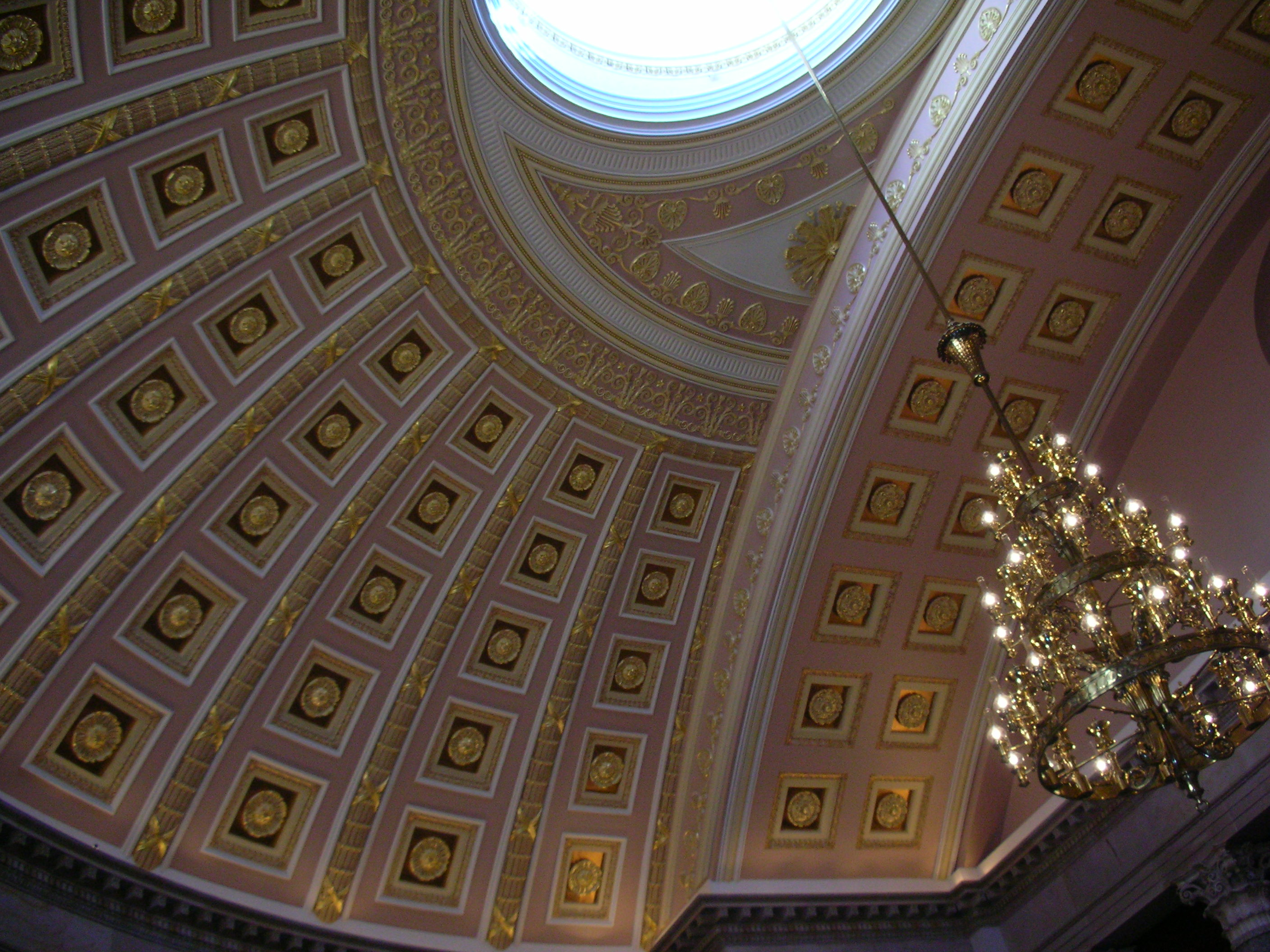
The double-sunk coffered ceiling in the National Statuary Hall

In 1864, in accordance with legislation sponsored by Representative Justin Morrill, Congress invited each state to contribute two statues of prominent citizens for permanent display in the room, which was renamed National Statuary Hall. The legislation also provided for the replacement of the chamber's floor, which was leveled and covered with the marble tile currently in the Hall. This modification, along with the replacement of the original wooden ceiling (which was painted to simulate three-dimensional coffering) with the present one in the early 20th century, eliminated most of the echoes that earlier plagued the room.

The first statue was placed in 1870. By 1971, all 50 states had contributed at least one statue, and by 1990, all but five states had contributed two statues. Initially all of the state statues were placed in the Hall. As the collection expanded, however, it outgrew the Hall, and in 1933, Congress authorized the display of the statues throughout the building for both aesthetic and structural reasons. Presently, 38 statues are located in National Statuary Hall.

The room was partially restored in 1976 for the bicentennial celebration. At that time, the original fireplaces were uncovered and replicas of early mantels were installed. Reproductions of the chandelier, sconces, and red draperies were created for the restoration project based on The House of Representatives, an oil painting by Samuel F.B. Morse done in 1822, which now hangs in the Corcoran Gallery of Art. Bronze markers were placed on the floor to honor the presidents who served in the House of Representatives while it met here.

In 2008, 23 statues were moved from the hall to the new Capitol Visitor Center.

Three people have lain in state in the National Statuary Hall:

- Elijah Cummings (October 24, 2019)
- Ruth Bader Ginsburg (September 25, 2020)
- Don Young (March 29, 2022)

Today, Statuary Hall is one of the most visited rooms in the Capitol. It is visited by hundreds of tourists each day and continues to be used for ceremonial occasions. Special events held in the room include activities honoring foreign dignitaries and every four years Congress hosts a newly inaugurated President of the United States for a luncheon.

== Statues ==
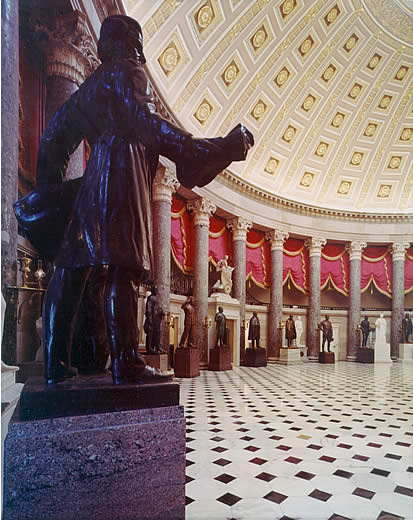
The National Statuary Hall with a statue of Jason Lee in the foreground

In addition to Car of History and Liberty and the Eagle, the hall contains 36 statues of historical figures. Except for the statue of Rosa Parks, all are part of the National Statuary Hall Collection. The following is a list of those statues, along with the state that donated each one.

Statue	State
Statue of Ethan Allen	Vermont
Statue of Daisy Bates	Arkansas
Statue of William Henry Harrison Beadle	South Dakota
Statue of Mary McLeod Bethune	Florida
Statue of Francis Preston Blair Jr.	Missouri
Statue of Norman Borlaug	Iowa
Statue of John Burke	North Dakota
Statue of Lewis Cass	Michigan
Statue of Henry Clay	Kentucky
Statue of Jefferson Davis	Mississippi
Statue of Amelia Earhart	Kansas
Statue of Thomas Edison	Ohio
Statue of Robert Fulton	Pennsylvania
Statue of Barry Goldwater	Arizona
Statue of Hannibal Hamlin	Maine
Statue of Sam Houston	Texas
Statue of Robert M. La Follette	Wisconsin
Statue of Jason Lee	Oregon
Statue of Huey Long	Louisiana
Statue of Rosa Parks	Commissioned by Congress
Statue of Francis Harrison Pierpont	West Virginia
Statue of Henry Mower Rice	Minnesota
Statue of Charles Marion Russell	Montana
Statue of Sequoyah	Oklahoma
Statue of Junípero Serra	California
Statue of John Sevier	Tennessee
Statue of George L. Shoup	Idaho
Statue of Standing Bear	Nebraska
Statue of Alexander H. Stephens	Georgia
Statue of Zebulon Baird Vance	North Carolina
Statue of Lew Wallace	Indiana
Statue of Daniel Webster	New Hampshire
Statue of Joseph Wheeler	Alabama
Statue of Marcus Whitman	Washington
Statue of Frances Willard	Illinois
Statue of Brigham Young	Utah

== See also ==
- Hall of Fame for Great Americans
- National Garden of American Heroes
