= List of public art in New Orleans =

This is a list of public art in New Orleans, in the United States. This list applies only to works of public art on permanent display in an outdoor public space. For example, this does not include artworks in museums. Public art may include sculptures, statues, monuments, memorials, murals, and mosaics.

Image	Title / subject	Location and coordinates	Date	Artist / designer	Type	Material	Dimensions	Designation	Owner / administrator	Wikidata	Notes
More images	Battle of Liberty Place Monument		1891		Obelisk					Q29576639	Removed in 2017
	The Boy with the Leaking Boot	Children's Hospital	1898							Q12203224	
	Bust of John McDonogh	Duncan Plaza 29.9532°N 90.0759°W	1938	Angela Gregory	Bust						Relocated in 1958
More images	General Beauregard Equestrian Statue	Beauregard Circle 29°59′02″N 90°05′23″W	1915	Alexander Doyle	Equestrian statue	Bronze				Q5530788	Removed in 2017
More images	Jefferson Davis Monument	Intersection of Jeff Davis Parkway and Canal Street 29°58′11″N 90°05′39″W	1911	Edward Virginius Valentine	Statue					Q21196439	Removed in 2017
	New Orleans AIDS Monument	Washington Square Park	2008	Tim Tate; Mitchell Gaudet	Monument	Bronze; Glass				Q105474321	
	Out of There	Hale Boggs Federal Building	1974	Clement Meadmore	Sculpture	Aluminum				Q60752353	
	Pikachu	Lower Garden District 29.9373071°N 90.0741292°W	2016		Statue	Fiberglass				Q26775830	Removed in 2016
More images	Robert E. Lee Monument	Lee Circle 29°56′35″N 90°04′20″W	1884	Alexander Doyle; John Roy	Monument	Bronze; Granite				Q7343855	Removed in 2017
	Statue of Benito Juárez	1200 Conti Street	1972	Juan Fernando Olaguíbel	Statue					Q65091730	
