= Tivoli Circle =

Central traffic circle in New Orleans, Louisiana

Coordinates: 29.9433°N 90.0725°W

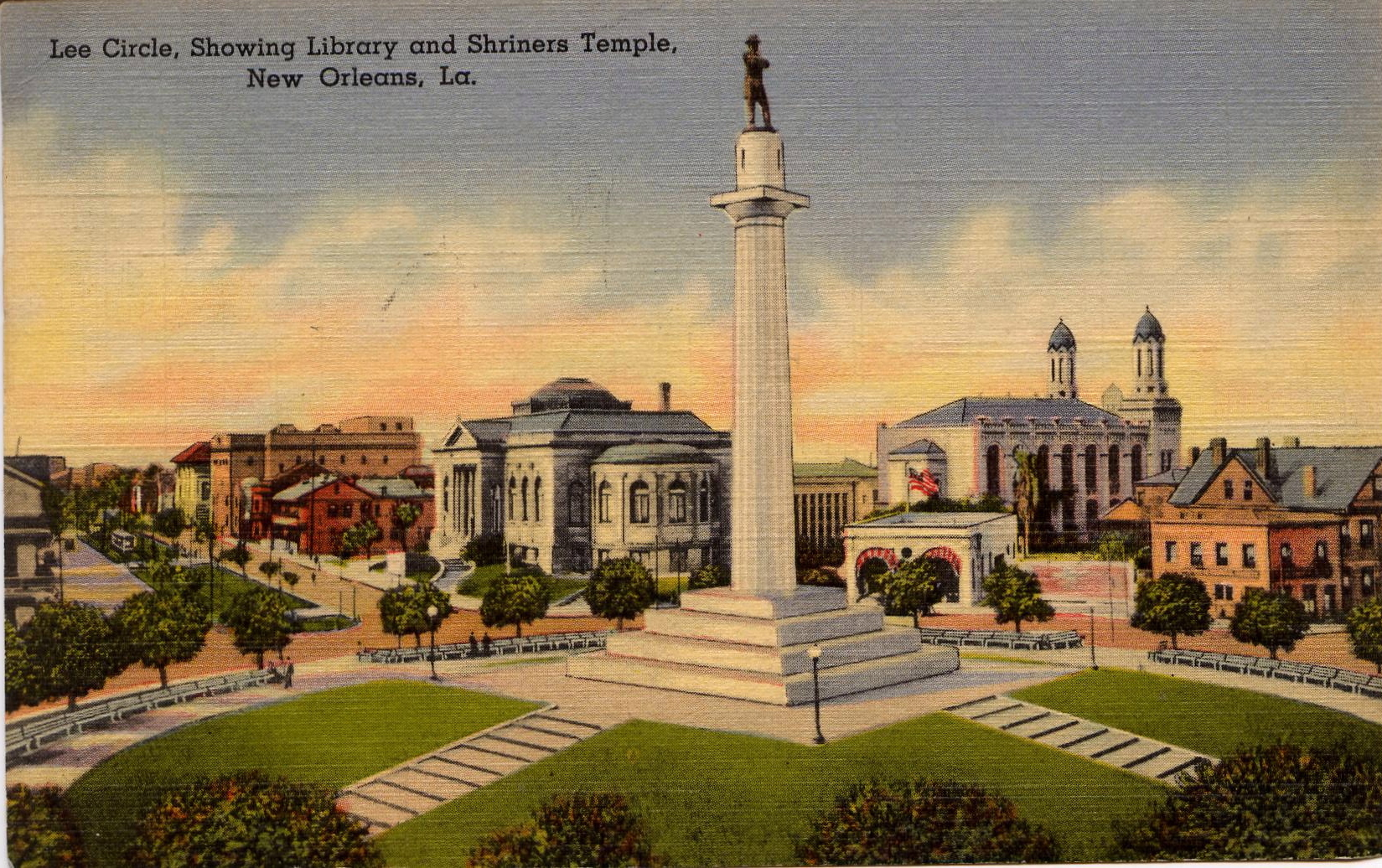
Postcard view of Tivoli Circle (formerly Lee Circle) in the early 20th century

Tivoli Circle is a central traffic circle in New Orleans, Louisiana. It featured a monument to Confederate General Robert E. Lee between 1884 and 2017. During this time, the circle was formerly known as "Lee Circle" until its name reverted to "Tivoli Circle" in 2022. The inner grass circle around the monument was also renamed as "Harmony Circle" as well.

== Etymology and history ==
On July 31, 1877, "Lee Place" for the circle was authorized by Ordinance A.S. 4064 Although the traffic circle was commonly referred to as "Lee Circle", the ordinance made it clear that the enclosure containing the statue is to be known as "Lee Place", while the traffic circle itself continues to be known as "Tivoli Circle". This ordinance contained no reference to the name "Lee Circle". The 1884 monument dedicated to Robert E. Lee was a bronze statue by Alexander Doyle, a prominent American sculptor known for statues dedicated to American Civil War figures. The sixteen-foot statue topped a sixty-foot (extant in place) column by John Roy.

The Circle is located at the intersection of St. Charles and Howard Avenues. Prior to the erection of the monument, the location was known as Tivoli Circle or Place du Tivoli, the park’s name derives from the legendary beauty of the centuries-old gardens from Tivoli in Lazio, Italy and is usually associated with public garden parks in Europe. Tivoli Circle was an important, central point in the city, as it linked upriver areas with downriver areas. It was a common local meeting point and the site remains a popular place to gather for Mardi Gras parades.

On June 24, 2015, New Orleans Mayor Mitch Landrieu acknowledged the impact of the June 2015 Charleston church shooting but credited a 2014 conversation with New Orleans jazz ambassador Wynton Marsalis for his decision to call for the removal of the Lee statue and renaming of Lee Circle and other city memorials of Confederate figures.

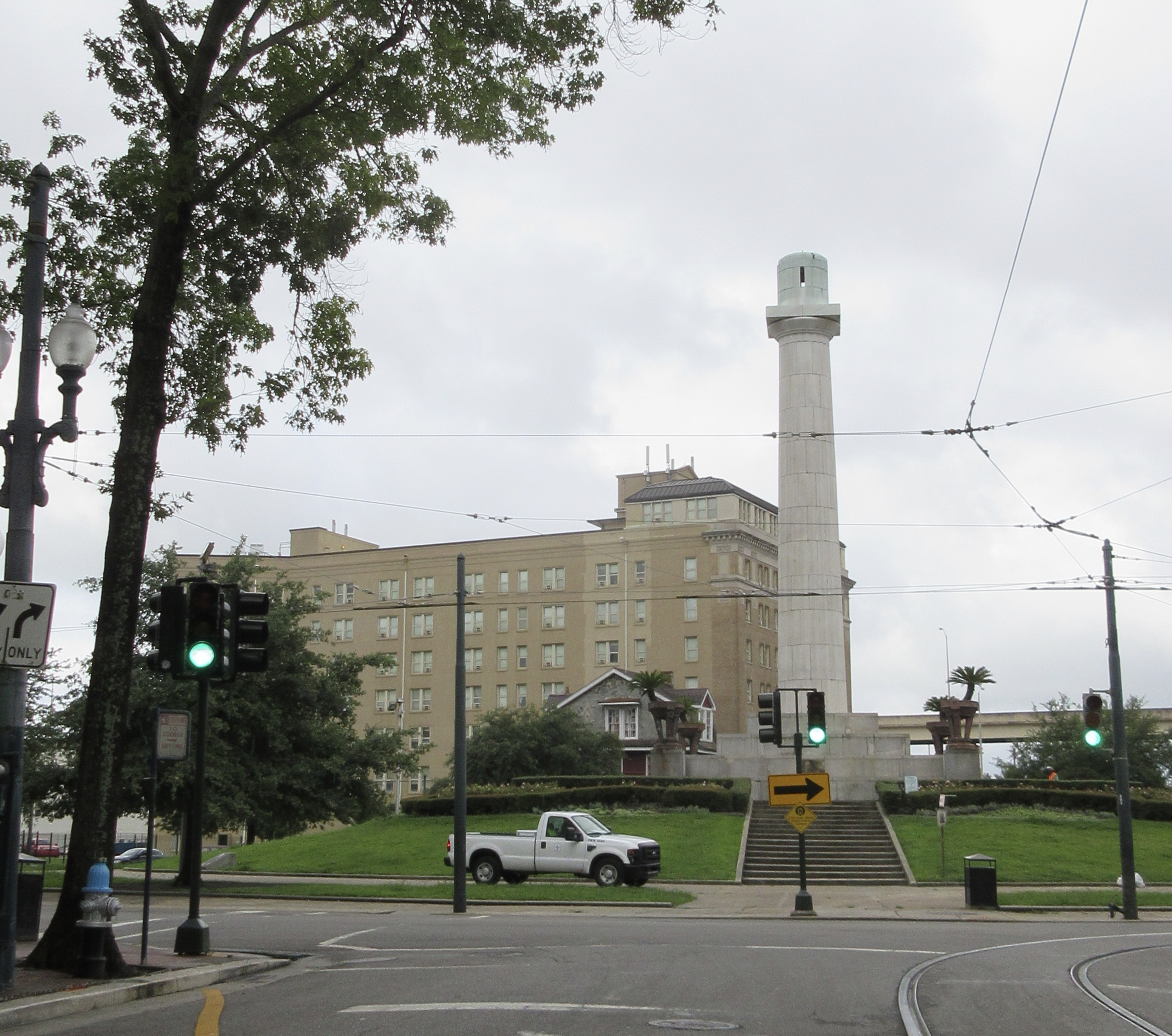
Tivoli Circle (Formerly Lee Circle) in 2017, with the monument of Robert E. Lee removed

As part of a sixty-day period for public input, two city commissions called for the removal of four monuments associated with the Confederacy: the statue of Robert E. Lee, the statue of Jefferson Davis and a statue of P.G.T. Beauregard, and an obelisk commemorating the "Battle of Liberty Place". Governor Bobby Jindal opposed the removals.

On December 17, 2015, the New Orleans City Council voted to remove the four monuments from public display. Four organizations immediately filed a lawsuit in federal court the day of the decision and the City administration agreed that no removals would take place before a court hearing.

On May 18, 2017, the City of New Orleans announced that the Lee statue would be removed at 9 a.m. the following day. This was the last of the four Confederate memorials to be removed by the city. The city also announced that the statue would be replaced with a water feature. The removal of the Lee statue was completed on the evening of May 19 at 6 p.m. C.D.T., a departure from the other removals which occurred during early morning hours under the cover of darkness.

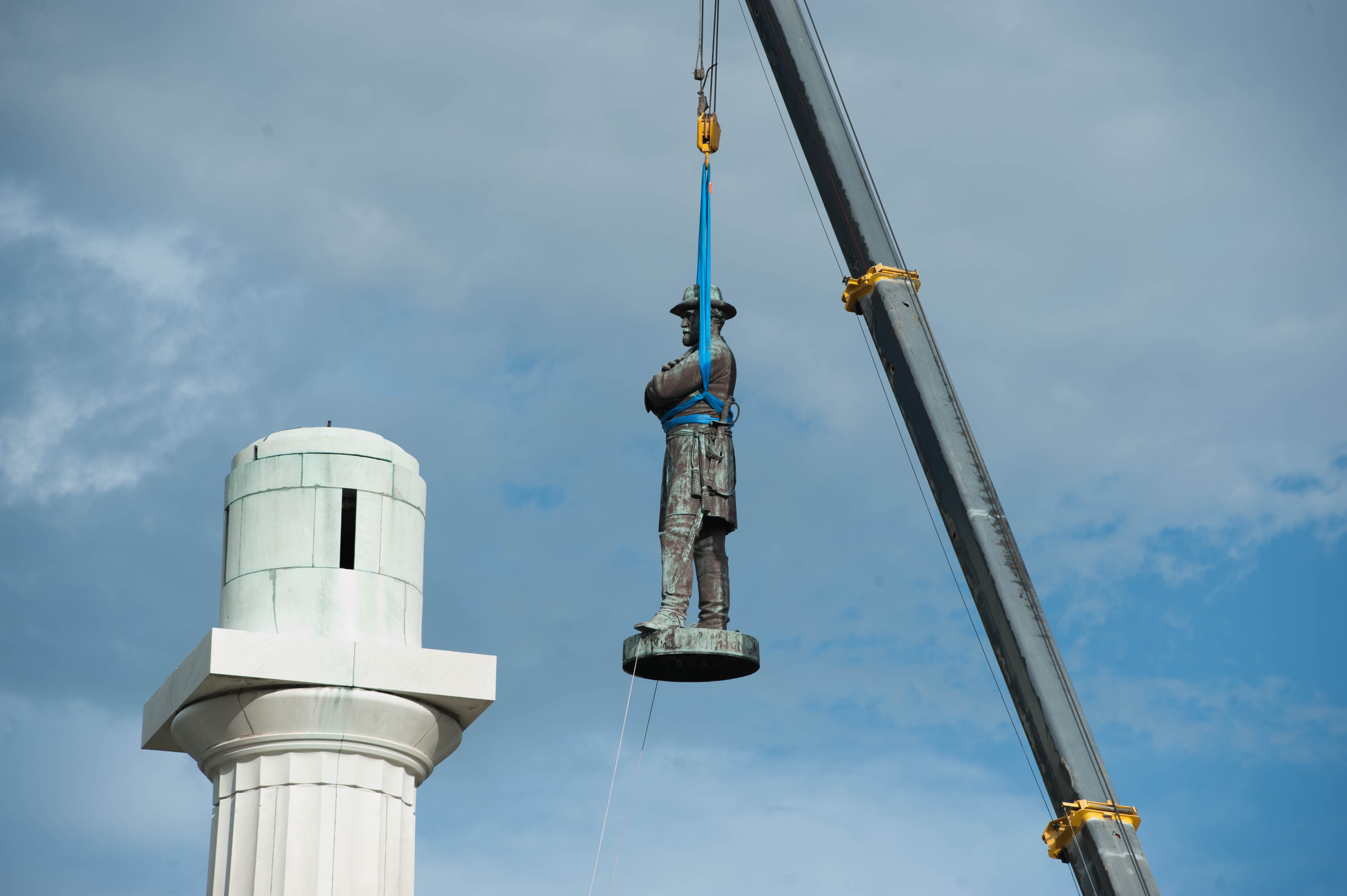
The Confederate General Robert E. Lee monument from the circle is removed from its perch.

On February 23, 2019, a rider was banned for life from a Mardi Gras parade for throwing beads bearing the likeness of the Lee statue, which she had created and sold online as a business venture for profit. The beads were against a city ordinance that restricts advertising and political messaging, and were known to be non-compliant within Orleans Parish. On April 21, 2022, the grassy park inside the location was renamed "Harmony Circle" by an ordinance of the New Orleans City Council, but the circle itself retained the name "Tivoli Circle", the original name for the site before the Lee statue went up in the 1880s. Council member Lesli Harris sponsored the ordinance.

== See also ==
- Robert E. Lee Monument (New Orleans, Louisiana)
- List of streets of New Orleans
