= Statue of Francis Preston Blair Jr. =

Statue in the U.S. Capitol by Alexander Doyle

Francis Preston Blair Jr.
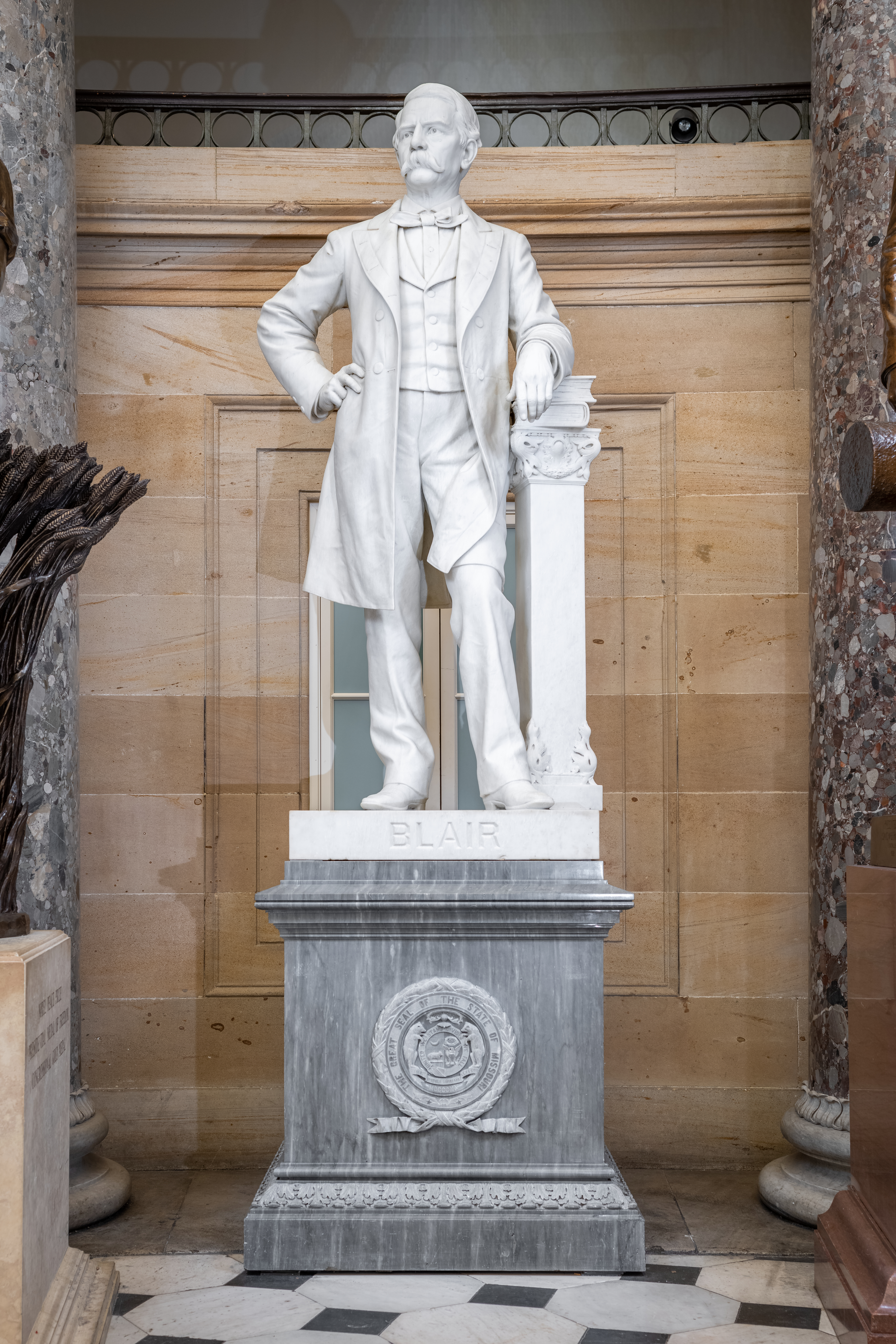
- The statue in the National Statuary Hall in 2023
- Artist: Alexander Doyle
- Medium: Marble sculpture
- Subject: Francis Preston Blair Jr.
- Location: Washington, D.C., United States

Francis Preston Blair Jr. is a marble sculpture of the American jurist, politician, and soldier of the same name by Alexander Doyle, installed in the United States Capitol's National Statuary Hall, in Washington, D.C., as part of the National Statuary Hall Collection. The statue was gifted by the U.S. state of Missouri in 1899.

== See also ==
- 1899 in art
