= Robert E. Lee Monument (New Orleans) =

- Formerly listed on the U.S. National Register of Historic Places
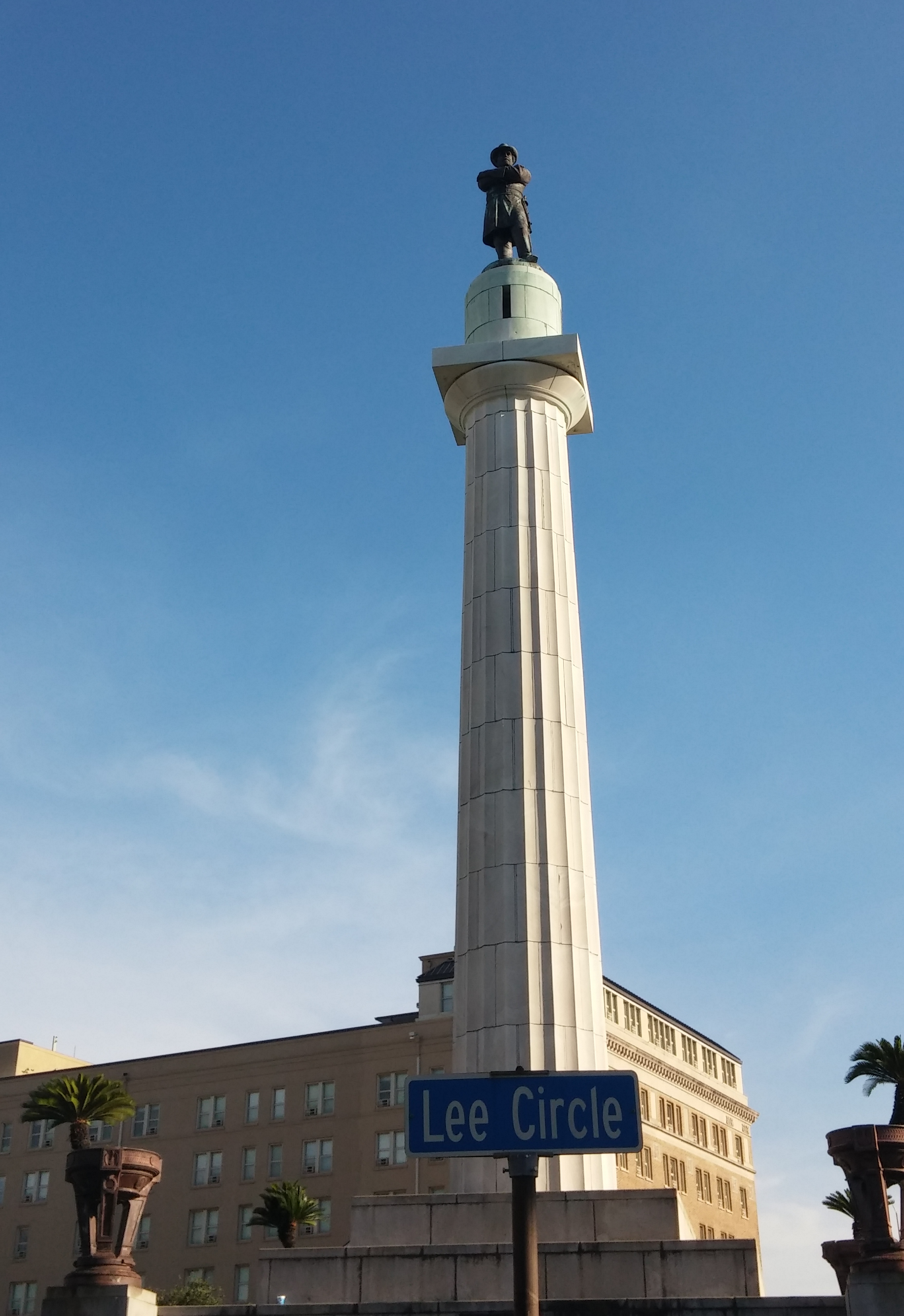
- The monument in 2015, 2 years before its removal

- Location within East New Orleans Location within Louisiana Location within the United States
- Location: Lee Circle (900–1000 blocks St. Charles Avenue), New Orleans, Louisiana
- Coordinates: 29°56′35″N 90°4′20″W
- Built: 1884
- Built by: Roy, John
- Sculptor: Alexander Doyle
- NRHP reference No.: 91000254

Significant dates
- Added to NRHP: March 19, 1991
- Removed from NRHP: November 6, 2024

The Robert E. Lee Monument, formerly in New Orleans, Louisiana, is a historic statue dedicated to Confederate general Robert E. Lee by American sculptor Alexander Doyle. It was removed (intact) by official order and moved to an unknown location on May 19, 2017. Any future display is uncertain.

== History ==
Efforts to raise funds to build the statue began after Lee's death in 1870 by the Robert E. Lee Monument Association, which by 1876 had raised the $36,400 needed. The association's president was Louisiana Supreme Court justice Charles E. Fenner, a segregationist who wrote a lower court opinion in the Plessy v. Ferguson decision. Sculptor Alexander Doyle was hired to sculpt the brass statue, which was installed in 1884. The granite base and pedestal was designed and built by John Ray [Roy], architect; contract dated 1877, at a cost of $26,474. John Hagan, a builder, was contracted to "furnish and set" the column at a cost of $9,350. The monument was dedicated in 1884, at Tivoli Circle (since commonly called Lee Circle) on St. Charles Avenue. Dignitaries present at the dedication on February 22—George Washington's birthday—included former Confederate president Jefferson Davis, two daughters of General Lee—Mary Custis Lee and Mildred Childe Lee—and Confederate general P.G.T. Beauregard.

The statue itself rises 16'6" tall, with an 8'4" base, standing on a 60' column with an interior staircase, according to a schematic released by the City of New Orleans on the day of the removal of the statue and its base, May 19, 2017. The Lee statue faced "north where, as local lore has it, he can always look in the direction of his military adversaries."

In January 1953, the statue of Lee was lifted from atop the column for repairs to the monument's foundation. The statue was returned to its perch in January the following year.

The monument was listed on the National Register of Historic Places in 1991. It was included by New Orleans magazine in June 2011 as one of the city's "11 important statues".

== Removal of the monument ==
On June 24, 2015, New Orleans mayor Mitch Landrieu acknowledged the impact of the June 2015 Charleston church shooting, but credited a 2014 conversation with New Orleans jazz ambassador Wynton Marsalis for his decision to call for the removal of the Lee statue and renaming of Lee Circle and other city memorials dedicated to Confederate slaveholders.

As part of a sixty-day period for public input, two city commissions called for the removal of four monuments associated with the Confederacy: the Lee statue, statues of Jefferson Davis and P.G.T. Beauregard, and an obelisk commemorating the Battle of Liberty Place. Governor Bobby Jindal opposed the removals.

On December 15, 2015, Wynton Marsalis explained his reasons for advocating removal in The Times-Picayune: "When one surveys the accomplishments of our local heroes across time from Iberville and Bienville, to Andrew Jackson, from Mahalia Jackson, to Anne Rice and Fats Domino, from Wendell Pierce, to John Besh and Jonathan Batiste, what did Robert E. Lee do to merit his distinguished position? He fought for the enslavement of a people against our national army fighting for their freedom; killed more Americans than any opposing general in history; made no attempt to defend or protect this city; and even more absurdly, he never even set foot in Louisiana. In the heart of the most progressive and creative cultural city in America, why should we continue to commemorate this legacy?"

Contrary to assertions that Robert E. Lee never set foot in New Orleans, he visited or passed through the city in 1846, 1848, 1860 and 1861, while serving in the United States Army. While in New Orleans, Lee was quartered at the military post of Jackson Barracks.

On December 17, 2015, the New Orleans City Council voted to relocate four statues from public display, among them the statue of Robert E. Lee located in Lee Circle. Four organizations immediately filed a lawsuit in federal court the day of the decision and the city administration agreed that no monument removals would take place before a court hearing scheduled for January 14, 2016.

In January 2016, David Mahler, a contractor who had been hired by the City of New Orleans to remove the four statues, including the statue of Robert E. Lee located in Lee Circle, backed out of his contract with the city after he, his family, and employees began receiving death threats. According to authorities in Baton Rouge, early on the morning of January 19, 2016, the Fire Department found a 2014 Lamborghini Huracán ablaze in a parking lot behind David Mahler's company, H&O Investments, LLC. The car, belonging to Mahler and valued at $200,000, was completely destroyed.

On March 4, 2016, state senator Beth Mizell, of Franklinton in Washington Parish, filed a bill in the Legislature seeking to block local governments in Louisiana from removing Confederate monuments and other commemorative statues without State permission. The Mizell bill was unexpectedly assigned by Senate President John Alario, a Republican from Westwego in Jefferson Parish, to the Senate Governmental Affairs Committee, rather than to the Senate Education Committee. This doomed the bill; five of the nine members of the Governmental Affairs Committee were African-American Democrats, and it was chaired by Karen Carter Peterson of New Orleans. The Education Committee was composed of six Republicans and two Democrats.

=== 2016–2017 legal developments ===
On March 25, 2016, a three-judge panel of the United States 5th Circuit Court of Appeals unanimously issued an injunction for the suit brought by the Monumental Task Committee and other groups in federal district court, prohibiting the City of New Orleans from proceeding forward with removal of the three Confederate monuments. The Court of Appeals set a hearing date of September 28, 2016, for oral argument for whether its injunction should be maintained pending a final judgment on the merits of the district court suit. The decision of the Court of Appeals superseded that ruling of United States District Court Judge Carl Barbier rendered January 26, 2016, denying the motion of the plaintiffs for a preliminary injunction against the City of New Orleans for prohibiting removal of the monuments.

On April 6, 2016, Senate Bill 276 by State Sen. Beth Mizell, R-Franklinton, to block local governments in Louisiana from removing Confederate monuments and other commemorative statues without State permission was rejected by the Governmental Affairs Committee on a 5–4 racial and party line vote. On August 14, 2016, pro-monuments House Bill 944 by Rep. Thomas Carmody, R-Shreveport, to create a state board with the power to grant or deny proposals to remove or relocate a statue, monument, memorial or plaque that has been on public property for more than 30 years died in the Municipal Affairs Committee after a 7–7 tie vote.

On March 6, 2017, following oral argument on September 28, 2016 of the motion for preliminary injunction of the Monumental Task Committee and other groups opposed to removal of the Confederate monuments, the three-judge panel of the United States Fifth Circuit Court of Appeals issued its opinion unanimously deciding the City of New Orleans should be enjoined no further and could proceed forward with removal of the three monuments. In support of its ruling the Court of Appeals panel held, "we have exhaustively reviewed the record and can find no evidence in the record suggesting that any party other than the City has ownership" and the plaintiffs failed to show any irreparable harm would occur to the monuments if the City of New Orleans were to remove them, even assuming such evidence would constitute a harm to the groups bringing the suit.

=== Dismantling ===
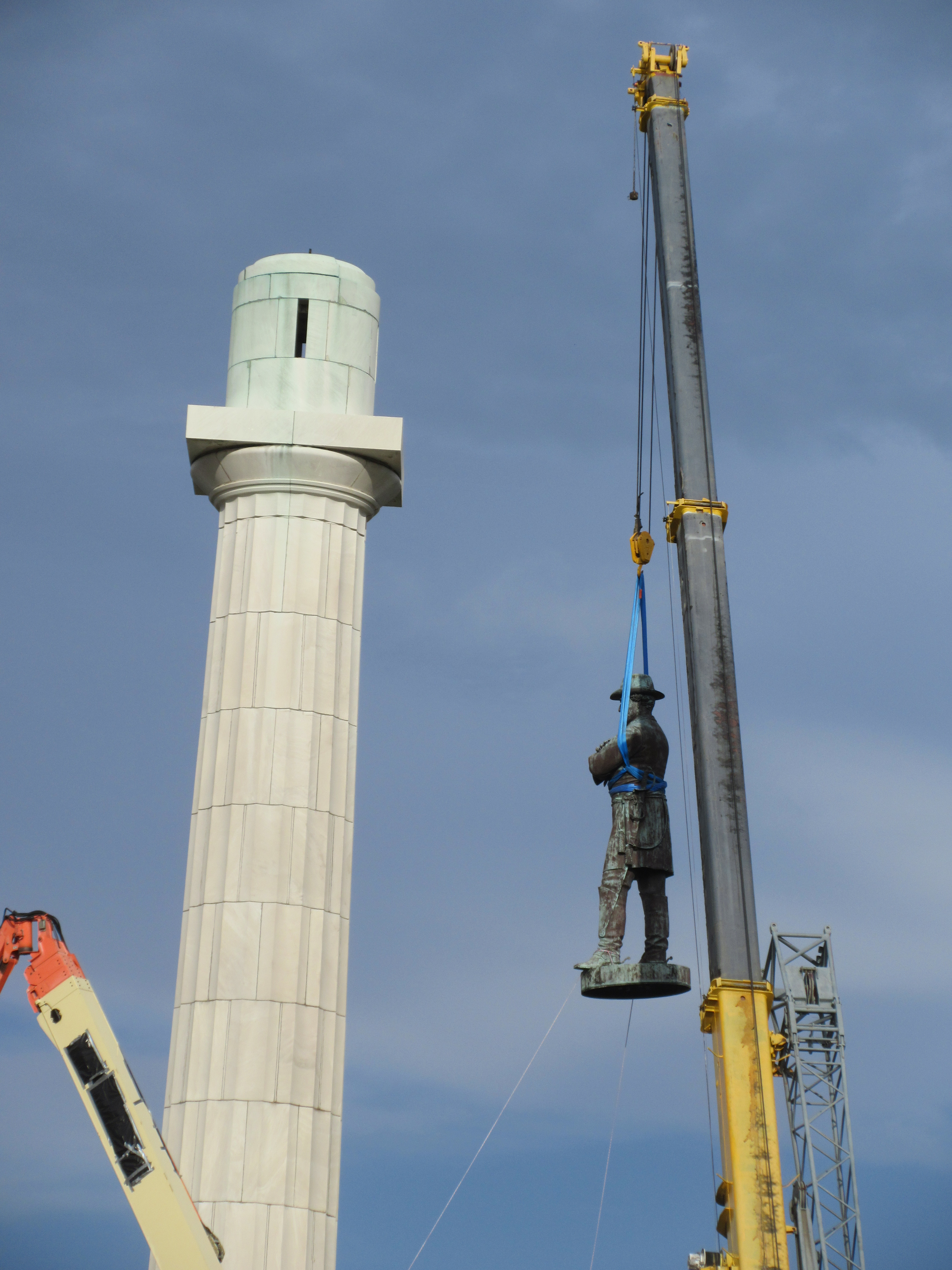
Removal of the statue, May 19, 2017

On May 18, 2017, the City of New Orleans announced the statue of General Robert E. Lee would be removed the next day. On May 19, 2017, following a day long effort by work crews, just after 6 o'clock p.m. the statue of Lee was finally detached and then removed and lowered by crane from its column pedestal to a semi-trailer truck and transported to storage.

While crews were working on removing the statue, New Orleans mayor Mitch Landrieu gave a speech at Gallier Hall discussing the historical context of the Lee and other monuments, and the reasons for and meaning of their removal.

The removal prompted Mississippi lawmaker Karl Oliver to post on Facebook that those supporting the take-down of the Confederate monuments "should be LYNCHED". He later apologized for this statement.

== See also ==
- Lee Circle
- List of memorials to Robert E. Lee
- National Register of Historic Places listings in Orleans Parish, Louisiana
- Jefferson Davis Monument (New Orleans, Louisiana)
- General Beauregard Equestrian Statue
- Removal of Confederate monuments and memorials
