= Statue of John E. Kenna =

Statue in the U.S. Capitol

John E. Kenna
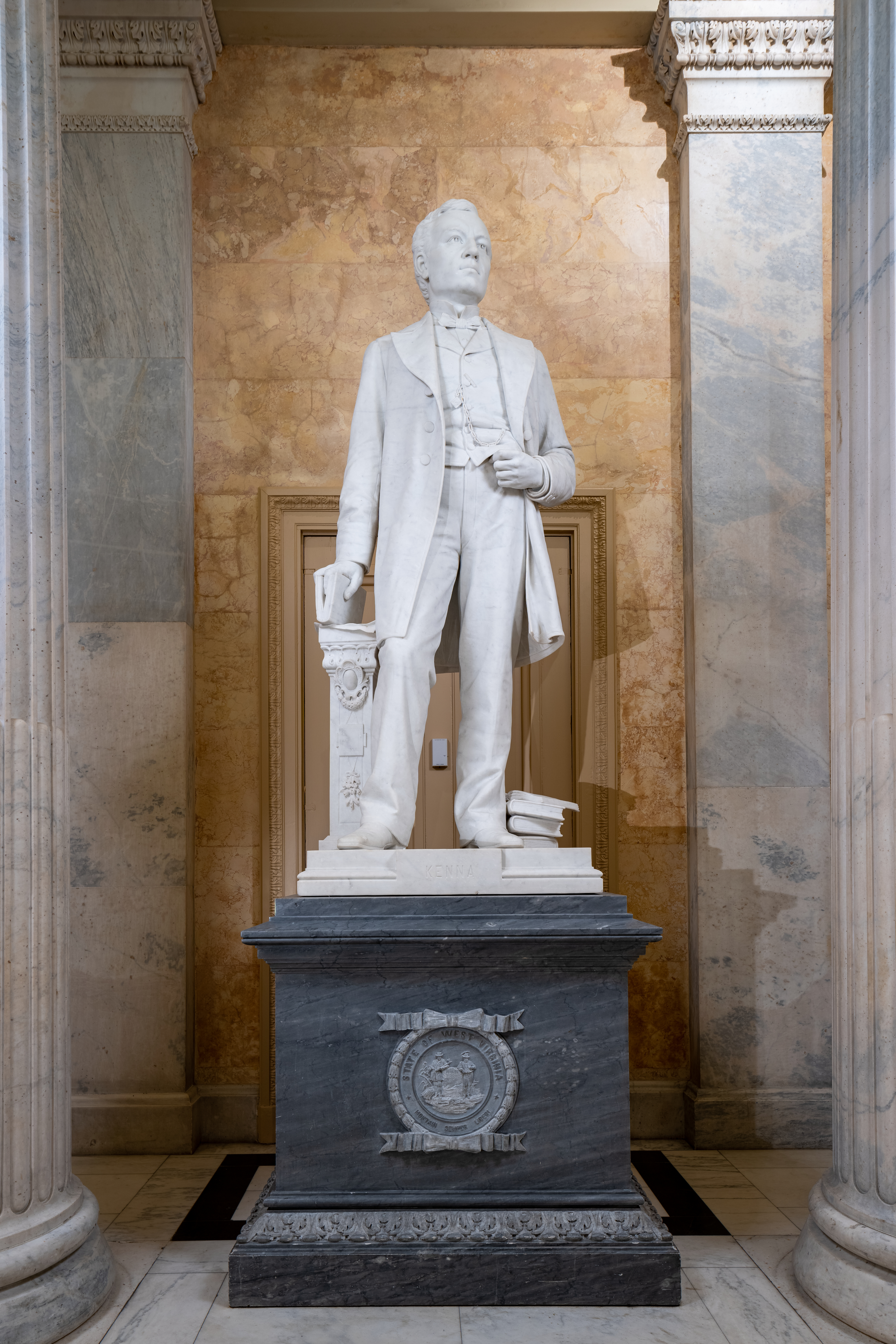
- The statue in the Hall of Columns in 2023
- Artist: Alexander Doyle
- Year: 1901
- Medium: Marble sculpture
- Subject: John E. Kenna
- Location: Washington, D.C., U.S.

John E. Kenna is a 1901 marble sculpture of the American politician of the same name by Alexander Doyle, installed in the United States Capitol, in Washington, D.C., as part of the National Statuary Hall Collection. It is one of two statues donated by the state of West Virginia.

== See also ==
- 1901 in art
