= Jefferson Davis Monument (New Orleans) =

Monument formerly installed in New Orleans, Louisiana, U.S.

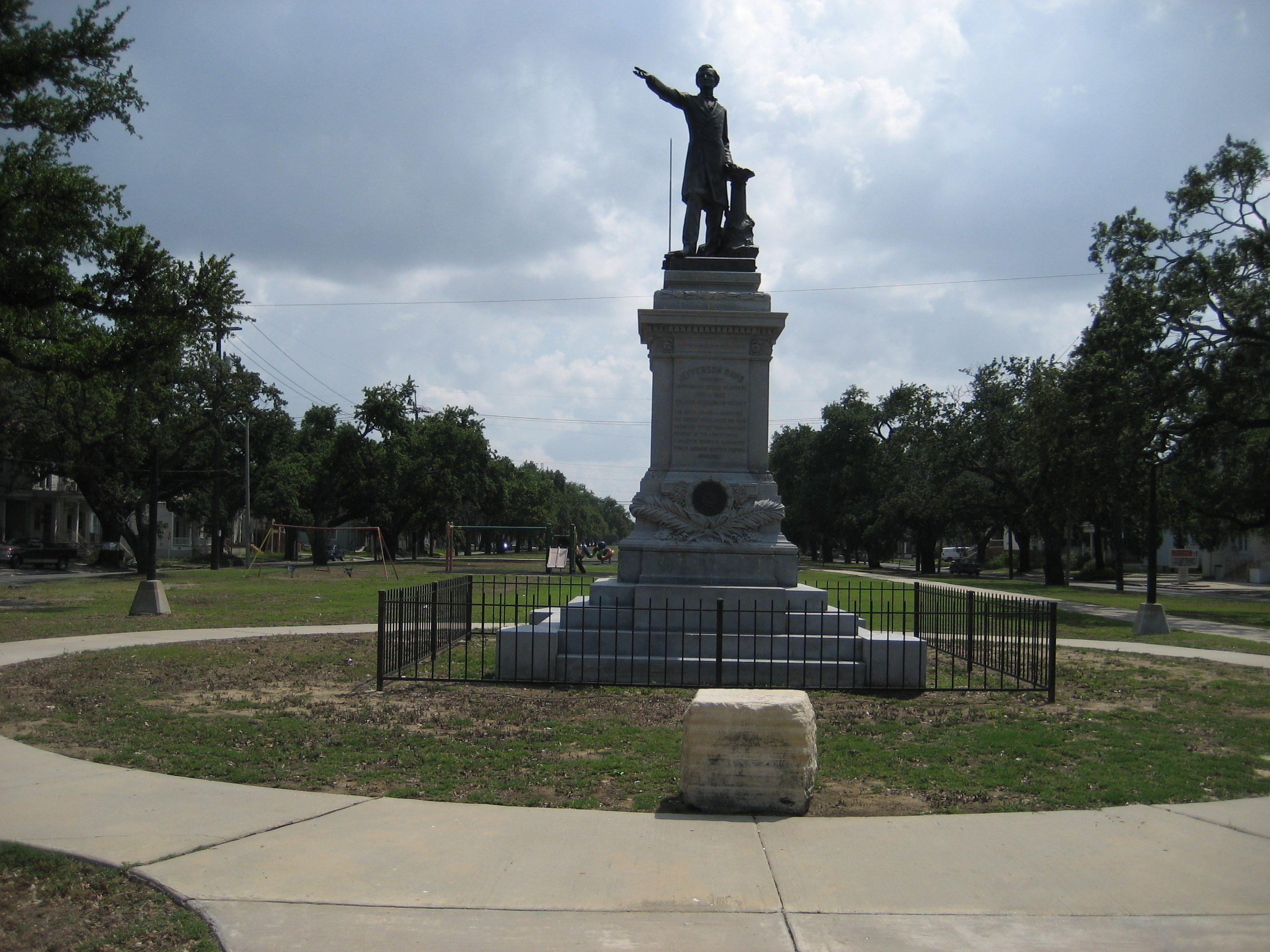
- The monument in 2015
- Interactive map of Jefferson Davis Monument
- Location: New Orleans, Louisiana, U.S.
- Coordinates: 29°58′11″N 90°05′39″W
- Dismantled date: 2017

The Jefferson Davis Monument, also known as the Jefferson Davis Memorial, was an outdoor sculpture and memorial to Jefferson Davis, installed at Jeff Davis Parkway and Canal Street in New Orleans, Louisiana, United States from 1911 to 2017.

== Description ==
Richmond artist Edward Virginius Valentine was the sculptor of the monument. A stone marker about 20 feet behind the sculpture reads: Site of Jefferson Davis Monument/Dedicated June 3rd 1908.

== History ==
=== Dedication ===
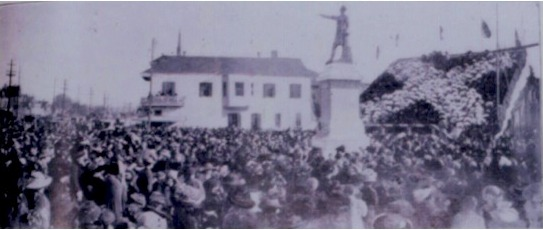
The statue's dedication in 1911

The statue itself was dedicated on February 22, 1911. The ceremony included a mass of schoolchildren dressed in red, white, and blue making a formation of a Confederate flag, and a speech by then-Louisiana Governor Jared Y. Sanders Sr., followed by the children singing "Dixie". Former Confederate officer Bennett H. Young also spoke at the ceremony. The date of dedication was said to correspond with the 50th anniversary of the inauguration of Jefferson Davis as President of the Confederate States of America, though the actual anniversary would have been four days earlier since Davis's inauguration was on 18 February 1861.

=== Controversy ===
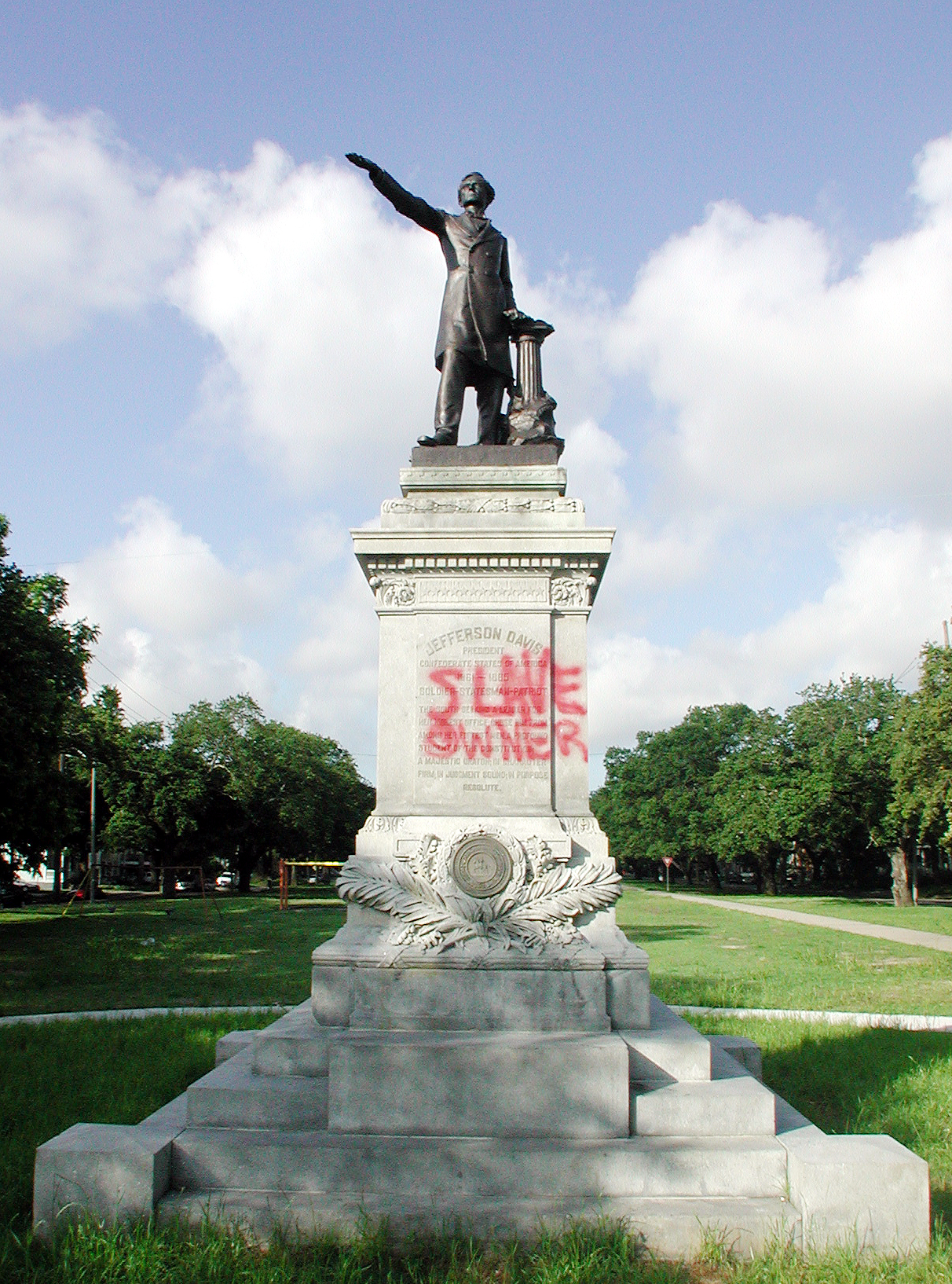
"Slave owner" vandalism

Since at least 2003 the statue was the subject of frequent vandalism.

After the Charleston church shooting in 2015, a concerted effort was launched to remove several monuments from public spaces in New Orleans, with Councilwoman LaToya Cantrell citing the Jefferson Davis Monument as "the one that really has some momentum around it." A grassroots activist group, Take Em Down NOLA, campaigned for their removal.

By decision of the New Orleans City Council in December 2015, the statue was ordered to be removed and stored in a warehouse until another location was found. Pro-monument supporters bearing Confederate flags and open-carrying firearms, surrounded the monument for weeks. They were confronted by locals who supported removal, and confrontations grew more heated until the City cordoned off the area.

The New Orleans local chapter of the Green Party of Louisiana issued a statement in support of the removal.

=== Removal ===
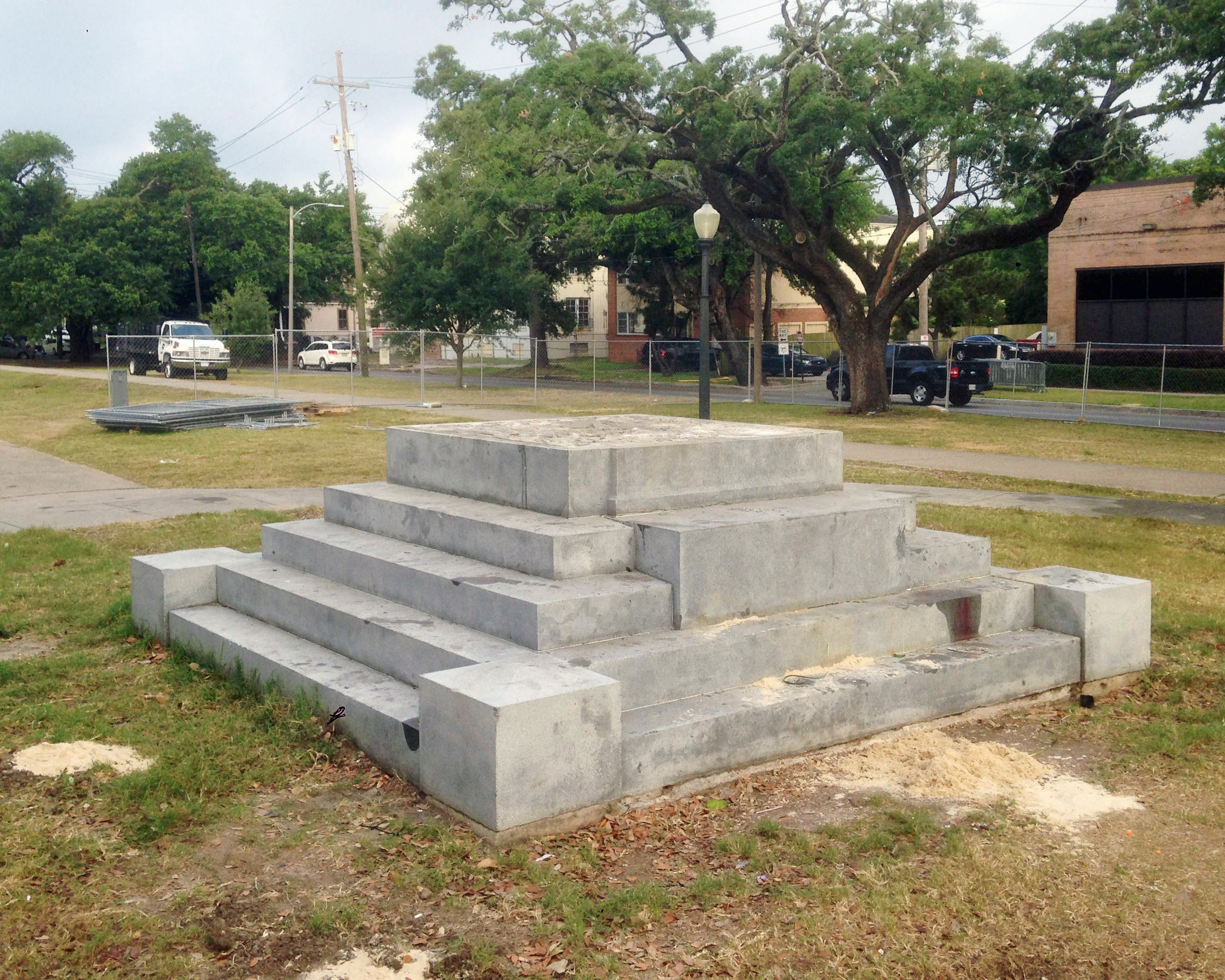
The monument's foundation after the removal of the statue, its pedestal and base.

On May 11, 2017, the statue of Davis was removed, on order from the City, despite the presence of dozens of protesters and supporters. Those removing the statue wore masks and helmets to hide their identities and the company name on their truck was hidden. After the statue's removal, the pedestal and base were also removed, leaving only the foundation. The cost of removing the statue was split between private donations and the City of New Orleans.

The statue was placed in storage at an undisclosed location. The City stated that it would be relocated, but no specific plans were announced. The parkway was renamed for former Xavier University of Louisiana president Norman C. Francis in 2020.

== See also ==
- Battle of Liberty Place Monument
- General Beauregard Equestrian Statue
- List of memorials to Jefferson Davis
- Robert E. Lee Monument (New Orleans, Louisiana)
