= Bust of John McDonogh =

Former public monument in New Orleans, Louisiana, U.S.

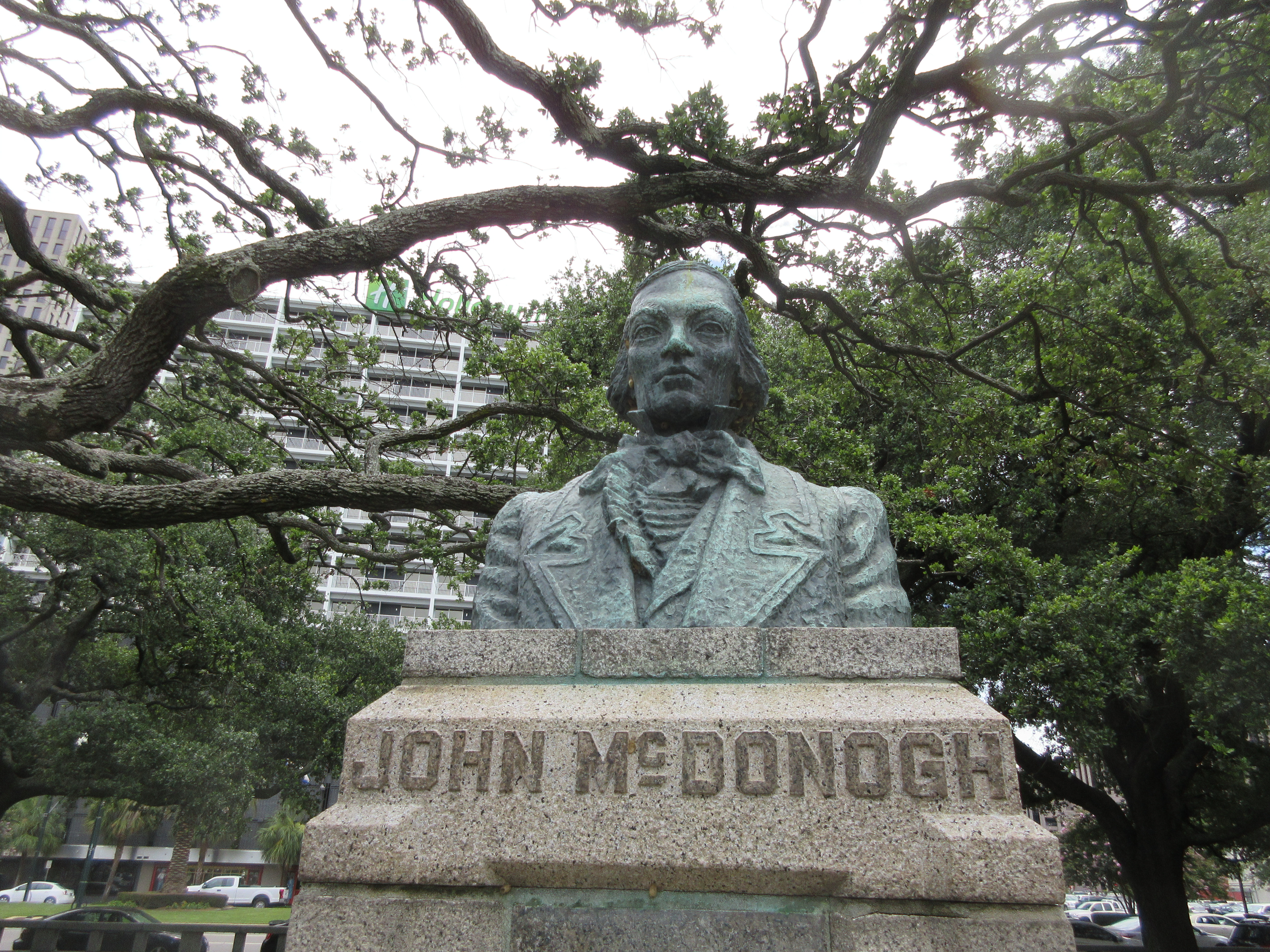
- The bust in 2017
- Year: 1938
- Subject: John McDonogh
- Location: New Orleans, Louisiana, U.S.; 29.9532°N 90.0759°W

A bust of John McDonogh was installed in New Orleans, Louisiana, United States in 1938, as part of the Federal Art Project. It was created by Angela Gregory, a New Orleans native, and was erected at what was designated "McDonogh Place", a small park in Uptown New Orleans at St. Charles Avenue and Toledano Street. In 1958, it was moved to Duncan Plaza by the new City Hall. The artwork was surveyed by the Smithsonian Institution's "Save Outdoor Sculpture!" program in 1993.

The sculpture was torn down by protesters on June 13, 2020, and rolled into the Mississippi River. The mayor of New Orleans, LaToya Cantrell, condemned the act on Twitter, calling it "unlawful". The bust was retrieved from the river a couple days later, and returned it to city officials.

== See also ==
- List of monuments and memorials removed during the George Floyd protests
