= Statue of Benito Juárez (New Orleans) =

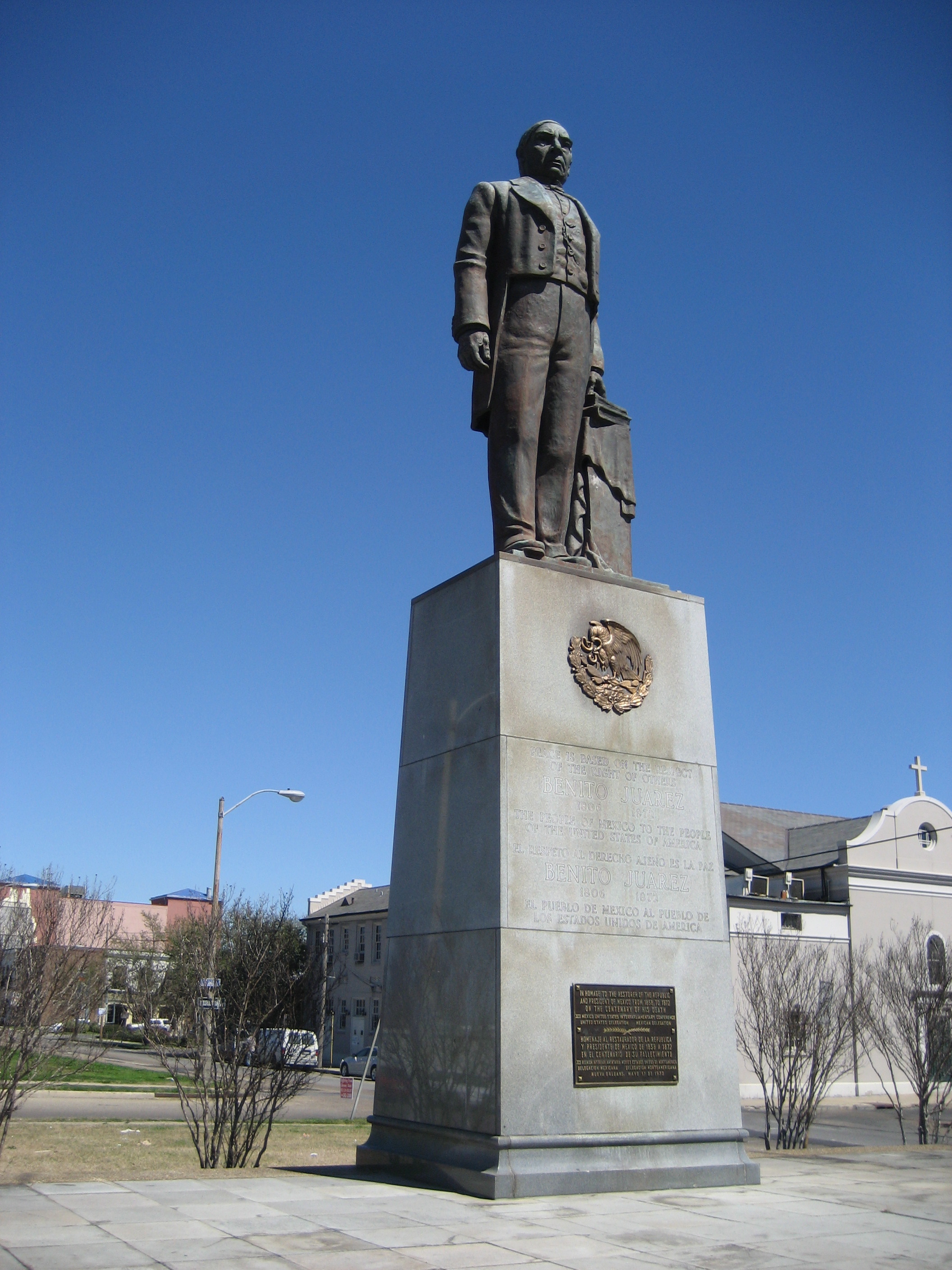
- Artist: Juan Fernando Olaguíbel
- Subject: Benito Juárez
- Location: 1200 Conti St, New Orleans, LA 70112; 29.95847°N 90.07133°W

The Statue of Benito Juárez in New Orleans is a statue of Benito Juárez, President of Mexico from 1858-1872, who lived in New Orleans for two separate periods in the mid-nineteenth century. Each stint was caused by the Oaxaca-born lawyer being exiled from his homeland for political reasons. His tenure in New Orleans was not particularly uncommon, as New Orleans has a long history of interaction with Mexico and Latin America in general.

== Juárez in New Orleans ==
Juárez was the governor of his native Oaxaca for six years before being imprisoned by then-dictator Antonio Lopez de Santa Anna for his liberal stances and activism. He escaped his political incarceration and took refuge in the French Quarter of New Orleans. He made his living by working at a tobacco factory, rolling cigars and cigarettes. In 1855, seeking to spark a revolution, the base document of which, the Plan of Ayutla he wrote in New Orleans, he returned to Mexico. He was successful, obtaining a prominent post in the Supreme Court of the newest iteration of the Mexican Republic.

In 1858, a civil war began in Mexico, an expression of tension from the recent regime change, and Juárez was forced to leave for New Orleans again, for a brief period of time. He then returned to Mexico, fought to regain control, and in 1861 reaffirmed his status as president, a position he would hold for the next eleven years, until his death.

== Statue ==
The statue of Juárez was part of a project launched by New Orleans Mayor Chep Morrison in 1957, in which a median on Basin Street would become a monument to New Orleans' place in the geopolitical history of the Western Hemisphere, dubbed the "Garden of the Americas", which would also come to include monuments to Simón Bolívar and Francisco Morazán. In 1965, the Mexican government gifted the city with the statue of Juárez, which was then placed in the neighborhood in which Juárez resided while exiled. On May 17, 1972, the one hundred year anniversary of Juárez's death, the statue was dedicated by the XII Mexico United States Inter-parliamentary Conference. The sculptor of the statue is Juan Fernando Olaguíbel. The statue is located at 1200 Conti St. Other statues of Juárez can be found in Washington D.C., New York City, and Chicago.
