= Angela Gregory =

American sculptor (1903–1990)

- Born: Angela Gregory; October 18, 1903; New Orleans, Louisiana, U.S.
- Died: February 13, 1990 (aged 86); New Orleans, Louisiana, U.S.
- Known for: sculpture, painting
- Parents: William B. Gregory (father); Selina Bres Gregory (mother)

Angela Gregory (October 18, 1903 – February 13, 1990) was an American sculptor and professor of art. Gregory has been called the "doyenne of Louisiana sculpture". She became one of the few women of her era to be recognized nationally in a field generally dominated by men.

== Early life ==
Angela Gregory was born on October 18, 1903 in New Orleans, Louisiana, to parents William B. Gregory and Selina Bres Gregory. Her mother, Selina Bres Gregory, was an artist who studied at Newcomb College in New Orleans with William Woodward and Ellsworth Woodward. Her father, William B. Gregory, was an engineering professor at Tulane University. Angela was interested in art from an early age and began her career in the late 1920s.

Gregory said she made her first piece of sculpture when she was twelve years old, crafting a birdbath out of chicken wire, concrete, and a wastebasket. Her early influences included her mother, Selina Bres Gregory (1870—1953), who had been a student of Ellsworth Woodward at Newcomb College in New Orleans and was an early Newcomb potter. As a child, Gregory was inspired by the story her mother told her about watching stonecutters carve an angel on the exterior of the Newcomb Chapel. “She used to tell me she loved to hear the sound of the tapping on [the stone]…Well, I was determined to do stone cutting.”

== Studying art in Paris ==
After taking summer art classes as a teen from William Woodward at Tulane University and later as a student in the Newcomb art school, and studying sculpture in Charles Keck’s New York studio in 1924, Angela Gregory graduated from Newcomb in 1925 with a Bachelor of Arts in design. She was awarded a one-year scholarship to the Paris branch of the Parsons School of Fine and Applied Arts to study illustrative advertising. Her real purpose in going to Paris, however, was to study stonecutting with the noted French sculptor, Antoine Bourdelle. Bourdelle had been a praticien in the studio of Auguste Rodin for many years before establishing his own studio in Paris in a cluster of buildings located on what was then Impasse du Maine. Today the buildings house the Musée Bourdelle on Rue Antoine Bourdelle.

Gregory studied for two years, 1926–1928, with Bourdelle, the only American admitted as a student to his private studios. She also took classes from him at the Académie de la Grande Chaumière. Early on, she asked Bourdelle what it would cost to study with him in his private studios. He replied, “I am an artist, not a businessman.” He refused any payment.

In Bourdelle’s studios, she sculpted a limestone copy of the fifteenth-century Beauvais Head of Christ under his tutelage. Gregory’s sculpture was exhibited at the Salon des Tuileries in Paris in 1928.

While studying in Bourdelle’s studio, Gregory met and became lifelong friends with Joseph Campbell. In a letter to her father, she wrote of Campbell: “He’s a very nice boy — clean, open face — and rather unusual in that he doesn’t drink and doesn’t smoke. He declines very graciously — each time. It was indeed amusing to dance with a 20th century youth who has enthusiasm and zest, and talks heatedly about religions and 'what’s beauty?'" Gregory sculpted a portrait bust of Campbell in the studio and as she worked the clay, the Master would occasionally step in to provide a critique and a philosophical discourse on the nature of art. The two young people were both deeply affected and influenced by the words of the Master.

Gregory also reconnected Campbell with Krishnamurti, who was posing for a portrait bust for Bourdelle at the time. Meeting Krishna again and attending one of his lectures at the Theosophical Society with Gregory was an important turning point in Campbell’s life.

In February 2019, the University of South Carolina Press published a memoir of Angela Gregory's years in Paris, A Dream and a Chisel: Louisiana Sculptor Angela Gregory in Paris, 1925-1928, co-authored by Angela Gregory and Nancy L. Penrose.

== Career ==
Gregory returned to New Orleans in 1928. The contrast with Paris was a shock: "There was no music, no art. It was hot as Hades. There was nothing. I thought I would go out of my mind. But after a while I realized that if you don’t have it inside you, it doesn’t matter if you are here or in Paris." She set up her own studio at the rear of her parents’ home on Pine Street. There, she worked for more than 50 years.

Her first major commission was at the young age of 25 and was for the architectural sculpture on the façade of the New Orleans Criminal District Courts Building. Upon completion, news reached as far as New York; the headline in the September 25, 1930, issue of the New York Sun read: Prison Walls Made Less Grim by Girl Sculptor, Who at 25 Executes Many Important Commissions.

In 1931, Gregory worked on a team of sculptors who executed historical panels for the façade of a new state capitol building in Baton Rouge built during the administrations of Governor Huey Long. Other work from this period includes a head of Aesculapius on the Hutchinson Memorial Building in Tulane Medical Center, sculpture for Tulane University’s McAlister Auditorium and many portrait busts. From 1934 to 1937 Gregory taught ceramics at Newcomb College and later was an artist-in-residence and sculpture professor there.

Gregory was involved in federal arts programs during the Depression. As part of that work, she created a monumental bust of John McDonogh which was installed in the municipal Duncan Plaza of New Orleans (1950s). In 1941, she became state supervisor of the Federal Works Progress Administration arts program in Louisiana.

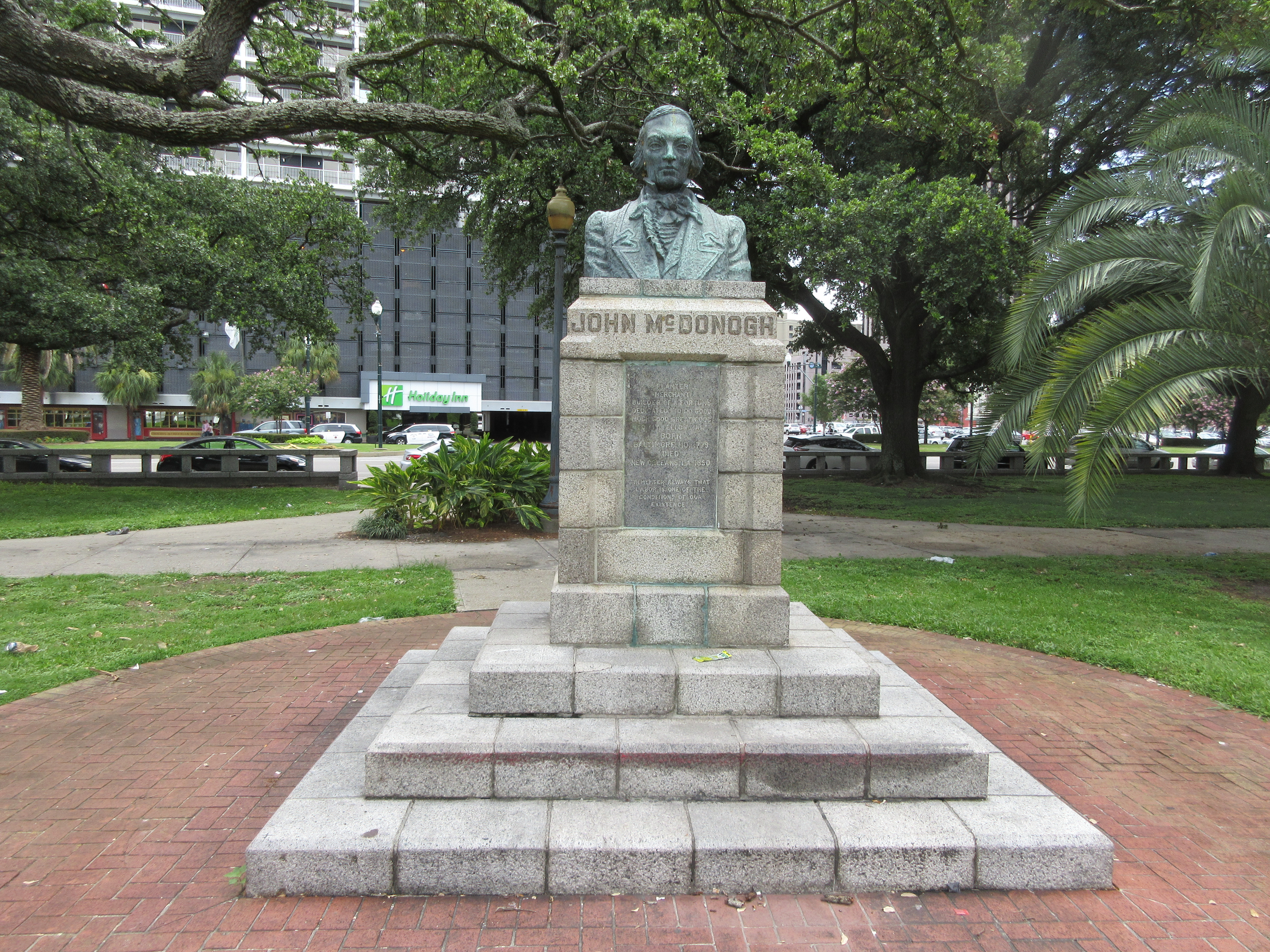
Duncan Plaza, New Orleans: John McDonogh monument sculpted by Angela Gregory; Photo by Infrogmation of New Orleans, June 2017

During World War II she served as an assistant architectural engineer for the Army Corps of Engineers in New Orleans and designed camouflage. Later in that time period she served as women’s counselor for Pendleton Shipyards, and as a consultant to the Celotex Corporation. After the war she returned to sculpture. Commissions included bas-relief murals for the Louisiana National Bank in Baton Rouge. She also restored sculptures on New Orleans’ Gallier Hall.

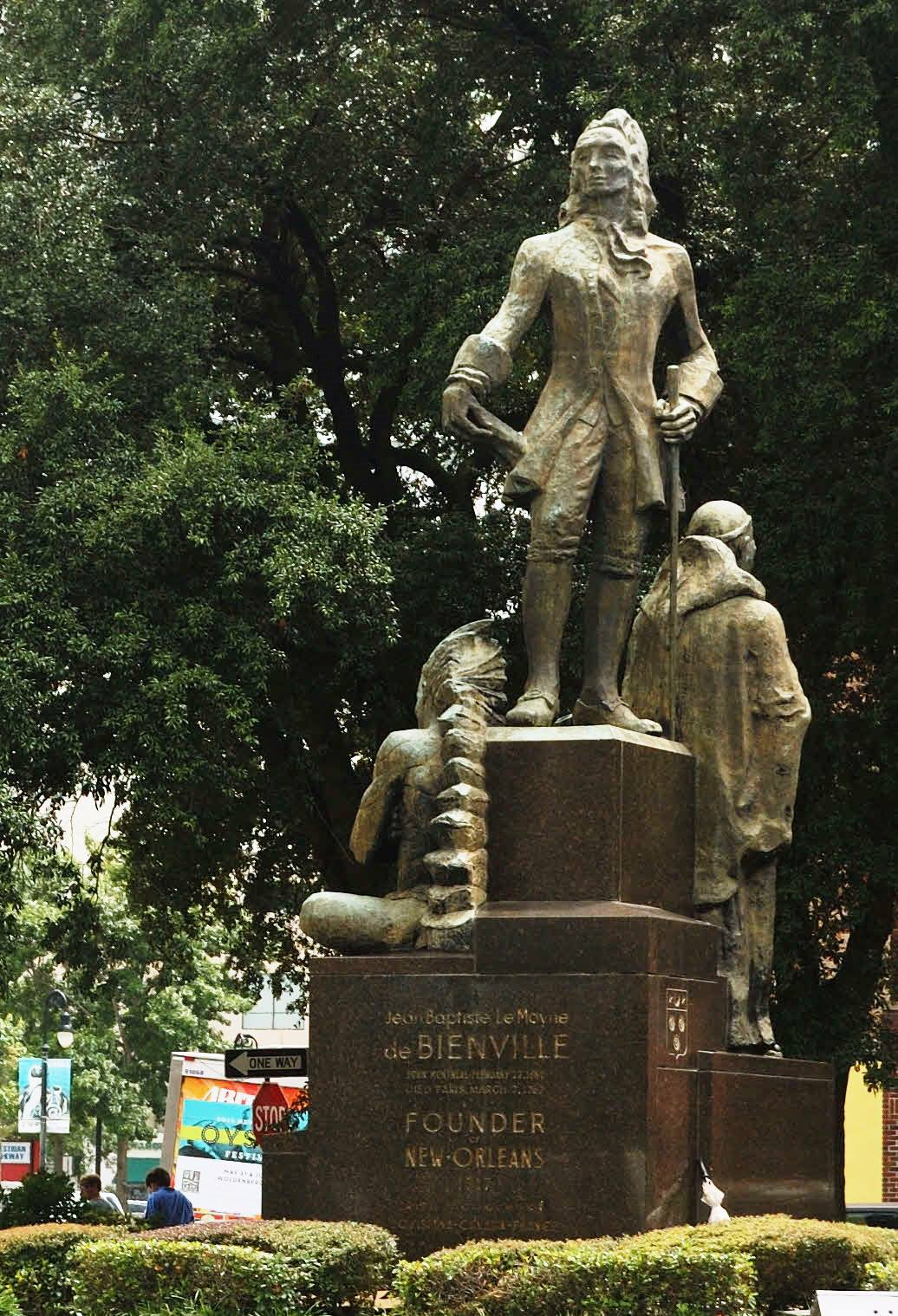
Jean-Baptiste Le Moyne de Bienville monument

In the 1950s, she devoted five years to the creation and casting of the bronze Bienville Monument, which stood outside the New Orleans train station on Loyola Avenue for many years. It now stands in a small park near the French Quarter, at the intersection of Decatur and Conti Streets. The monument portrays the first French governor and founder of New Orleans, a priest, and an Indian. Gregory spent two years in France supervising the casting of the monument.

Gregory was a professor and sculptor-in-residence for two decades at the St. Mary’s Dominican College in New Orleans, and was named professor emerita when she retired in 1976. During her years at Dominican, she created a series of aluminum and walnut panels tracing the life of Pope John XXIII at the Dominican College library. Other work of that era included a statue of St. Louis for the Archdiocese of New Orleans’ Notre Dame Seminary, and a statue of St. Fiacre in the garden of Christ Church Cathedral.

In 1962, she sculpted the monument to Henry Watkins Allen in Port Allen, Louisiana.

Gregory is often credited with being one of the few women sculptors of her era to complete three public monuments. Gregory’s Pine Street studio was a “meeting place for musicians, diplomats, distinguished guests from France, writers like close friend Thornton Wilder, and actors like Kirk Douglas, whose wedding reception was in her studio.”

In a statement written by Gregory in 1985 for her entry in Virginia Watson-Jones' survey book of Contemporary American Women Sculptors, Gregory explained: “In my portrait busts and monuments, I have attempted to maintain a strong tectonic quality while being primarily interested in portraying the sensitive, subtle quality of the individual.”

== Critic response ==
Writing in the catalogue for A Retrospective Exhibition, Angela Gregory, Newcomb 1925, and A Collection of the Works of Selina E. Bres Gregory, Newcomb, 1896, Tulane Professor James Lamantia wrote of Angela Gregory: “Eschewing the overbearing rush toward abstraction so characteristic of the second quarter of our century, she had consistently embraced the natural image. The strength of this key decision she molds with her own personality, carrying it beyond the obvious influence of Bourdelle.” Lamantia continues: “Her collaborations with architects can only be hinted at in a gallery display, yet are necessary to recognize in any assessment of her work since they represent an involvement inculcate in the broader objectives of the grand tradition.”

== Legacy ==
Gregory’s work has been exhibited at the Salon des Tuileries, at the National Gallery in Washington and the Metropolitan Museum of Art in New York. She is also represented in private collections and several museums.

In 1982 she was named Chevalier de L’Ordre des Arts et des Lettres by the French minister of culture. Tulane University and Newcomb College each named her outstanding alumna. At the time of her death she was one of the few women fellows of the National Sculpture Society.

== Controversy ==
In July 2020, in the wake of the George Floyd protests, Gregory's Henry Watkins Allen monument (1962) in Port Allen, Louisiana was criticized as a symbol of white supremacy. Activists asked that the monument be removed or contextualized, considering Allen's service in the Confederate States Army and as Governor of Louisiana during the American Civil War, and his ownership of slaves. As of 2025, the monument remained in place.

== See also ==
- Statue of Henry Watkins Allen
