= General Beauregard Equestrian Statue =

- Beauregard, Gen., Equestrian Statue
- U.S. National Register of Historic Places
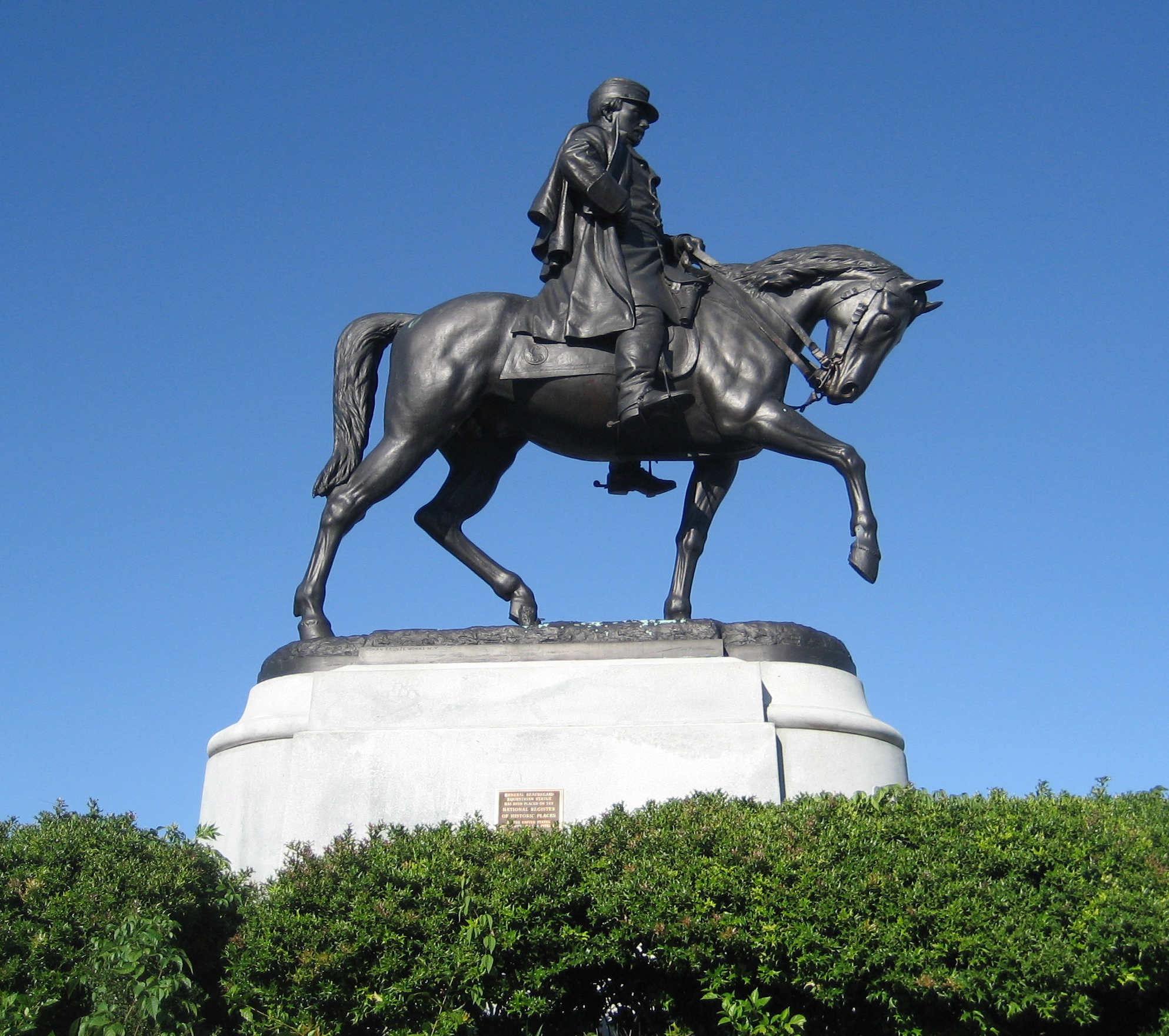
- The statue in 2008

- Location within East New Orleans Location within Louisiana Location within the United States
- Location: Jct. of Esplanade Ave. and Wisner Blvd., New Orleans, Louisiana
- Coordinates: 29°59′2″N 90°5′23″W
- Area: less than one acre
- Built: 1913
- NRHP reference No.: 99000233
- Added to NRHP: February 18, 1999

The General Beauregard Equestrian Statue, honoring P. G. T. Beauregard, was located in New Orleans, Louisiana, United States. The statue, by Alexander Doyle, one of the premier American sculptors, was officially unveiled in 1915.

It was at the intersection of Carrollton Avenue and Esplanade Avenue at the main entrance to City Park, on Beauregard Circle. The statue was added to the National Register of Historic Places on February 18, 1999.

== Removal ==
On June 24, 2015, New Orleans Mayor Mitch Landrieu acknowledged the impact of the June 2015 Charleston church shooting, and after talking with New Orleans jazz ambassador Wynton Marsalis, Landrieu called for the removal of several city memorials to Confederates.

As part of a sixty-day period for public comment, two city commissions accepted the Mayor's call for the removal of four monuments associated with the Confederacy, including statues of Robert E. Lee, Jefferson Davis and Beauregard, and an obelisk commemorating the Battle of Liberty Place. Governor Bobby Jindal opposed the removals.

On December 17, 2015, the New Orleans City Council voted 6-to-1 to remove the Gen. Beauregard Statue, along with three other historical monuments built 100 to 135 years ago. Mayor Landrieu announced that the removal of the monuments would happen within days.

The statue's removal began on May 16, 2017, and was completed on May 17.

After the statue was removed, its pedestal remained in place. On July 25, 2018 after the base of the statue was removed, a time capsule was discovered to exist. The capsule was opened on August 3, 2018 and found to contain Confederate memorabilia, including photos of Confederate General Robert E. Lee and Confederate President Jefferson Davis, along with flags, currency, medals, ribbons and other paper items related to the city. Officials stated that the copper box was placed in the statue's pedestal on November 14, 1913, a year before the statue was erected.

== See also ==
- National Register of Historic Places listings in Orleans Parish, Louisiana
- Robert E. Lee Monument
- Jefferson Davis Monument
- Bronze Soldier of Tallinn in Estonia
- Removal of Confederate monuments and memorials
