= Alexander Doyle =

American sculptor (1857–1922)

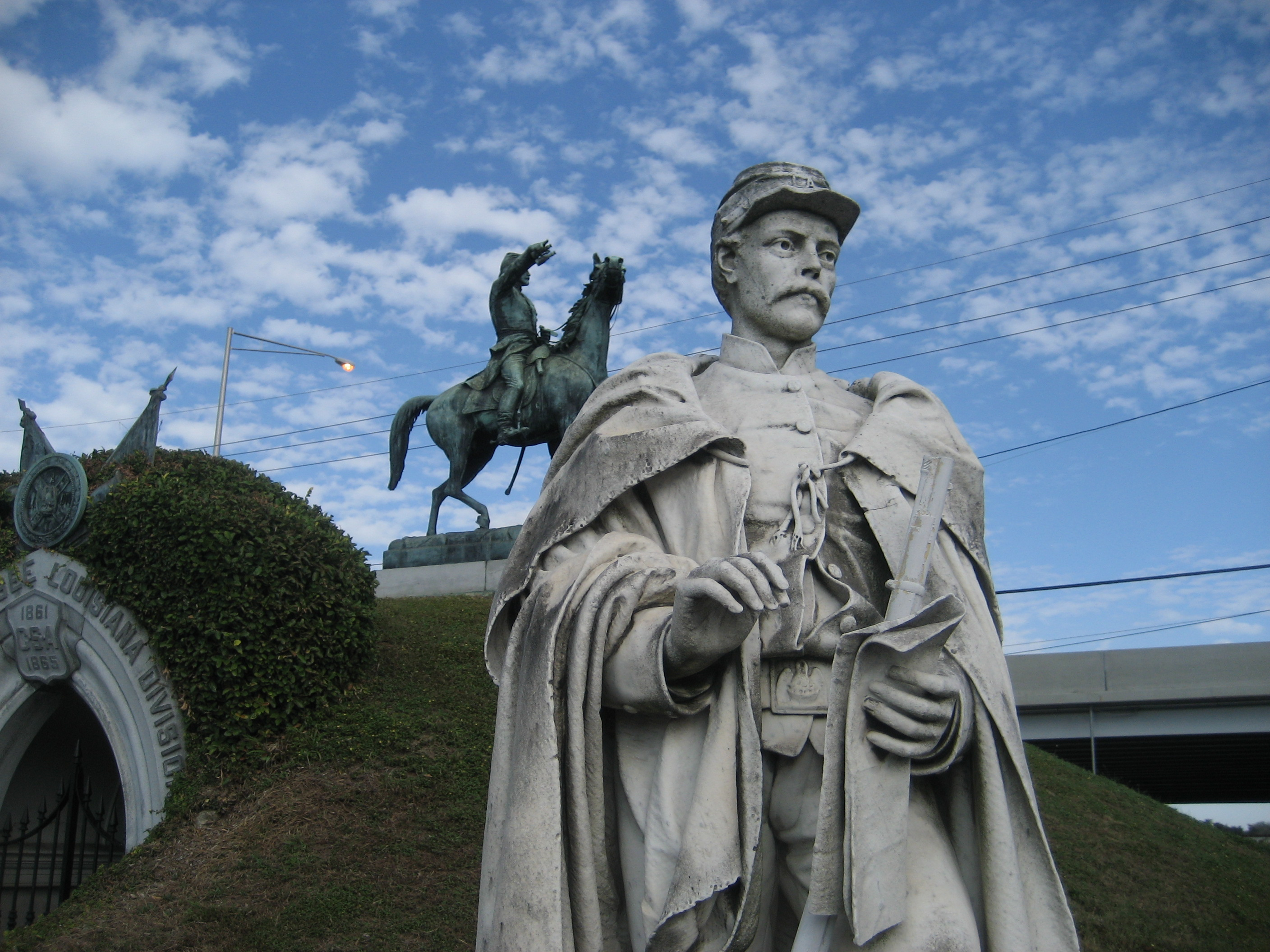
Doyle's Confederate Soldier (1885); in background Doyle's equestrian statue of General Albert Sidney Johnston (1877), Metairie Cemetery, New Orleans.

Alexander Doyle (1857–1922) was an American sculptor.

Doyle was born in Steubenville, Ohio, and spent his youth in Louisville, Kentucky, and St. Louis, Missouri, before going to Italy to study sculpture in Bergamo, Rome, and Florence, studying with Giovanni Duprè, Carlo Nicoli and Fernando Pelliccia.

After returning to the United States he settled in New York City and became one of the most prominent sculptors of the era. There are three statues by Doyle in National Statuary Hall in Washington, D.C.: Thomas Hart Benton (Thomas Hart Benton), Francis Preston Blair Jr. (Francis Preston Blair Jr.) and John E. Kenna (John E. Kenna).

Doyle became a sculptor of marble and bronze monuments of historical figures including Civil War participants and other prominent persons. He studied in Italy at the National Academies at Carrara, Rome, and Florence and was a member of the Royal Raphael Academy. His work can be found throughout the United States including in Washington, D.C., Missouri, Alabama, New York, Ohio, Indiana, Georgia, and Mississippi.

In New Orleans, where he was active in 1882 and 1883, he created a trio of important sculptures of Confederate States Army generals. These are: the city's iconic figure of General Robert E. Lee at Lee Circle, dedicated in 1884 and removed by Mayor Mitch Landrieu on May 19, 2017; the massive bronze General Beauregard Equestrian Statue at the entrance to City Park (1915), removed on May 16 of 2017 and placed in a city junk yard; and the bronze statue of General Albert Sydney Johnston atop the Army of the Tennessee cenotaph in Metairie Cemetery (1887). According to Leonard V. Huber, author of New Orleans Architecture: The Cemeteries, Doyle's finest work is "Calling the Roll" (1885), a marble sculpture of an unknown Confederate soldier. "Calling the Roll" stands before the General Johnston bronze monument in Metairie Cemetery.

A Doyle marble statue of Margaret Haughery, a New Orleans woman who devoted her life to the poor, was erected in 1889, the first monument to honor a female philanthropist in the United States.

The "Alexander Doyle Papers, 1852-1937" are located in the Smithsonian Institution’s Archives of American Art in Washington D.C.

== Partial list of works ==
Title	Year	Location/GPS Coordinates	Material	Dimensions	Notes	Image
Washington Artillery Memorial Cenotaph	1880	Metairie Cemetery, New Orleans	Granite	Sculpture: approx. H. 8 ft.; Base: approx. 20 × 20 × 20 ft		
Francis Scott Key Grave and Monument	1881	Mount Olivet Cemetery, Frederick, Maryland	Bronze sculpture on stone base	Sculpture: approx. 15 ft. × 80 in. × 80 in.; Base: approx. 10 ft. × 80 in. × 80 in.		
William Pinkney Funerary Monument	c. 1883	Oak Hill Cemetery, Washington, D.C.	Marble		Commissioned by William Wilson Corcoran.	
Margaret Haughery Memorial, "The Bread Giver"	1884	New Orleans, Louisiana	Marble on granite base	Sculpture: approx. H. 5 ft.; Base: approx. H. 7 ft	Made for the Citizens' Committee of New Orleans.	
Robert E. Lee Monument	1884	Lee Circle, New Orleans	Bronze sculpture on granite column	Sculpture: approx. H. 16 ft.; Column: approx. 90 ft.	Removed in May 2017.	
John Howard Payne Funerary Monument		Oak Hill Cemetery, Washington, D.C.	Marble		Commissioned by William Wilson Corcoran.	
Statue of Benjamin Harvey Hill	1885	Georgia Capitol Museum, Atlanta	Marble	161 × 53 × 53 in	"Portrait of Benjamin Harvey Hill standing with his right hand resting on a podium and his left hand pulling back the side of his overcoat, and resting on his left hip."	
Calling the Roll	1886	Metairie Cemetery, New Orleans	Marble	Sculpture: approx. 6 × 3 × 3 ft.; Base: approx. 3 × 3 × 3 ft.	Adjacent to the mausoleum set up by Association Army of Tennessee, Louisiana Division, C.S.A with Doyle's Equestrian Statue of General Albert Sidney Johnston. The sculpture was a gift of Charles T. Howard. The sculpture depicts a Confederate soldier calling role; the soldier's face was carved based on the photography of New Orleans Confederate Soldier William Brunet.	
General Philip Schuyler, Saratoga Battle Monument	1886	Saratoga National Historical Park (Victory, New York)	Bronze	approximately 7 feet		Image of sculpture
General James B. Steedman Monument	1887	Riverside Park (Toledo, Ohio)	Bronze sculpture on a Vermont marble base on a second concrete base.	Figure: approx. H. 10 ft. × W. 3 ft.; Base: approx. 20 × 9 × 9 ft.; Concrete base: approx. H. 4 ft. × Diam. 35 ft. (2,200 lbs.).		Image of sculpture
General Albert Sidney Johnston Equestrian Statue	1887	Metairie Cemetery, New Orleans	Bronze on granite base	Sculpture: approx. 10 × 3 × 8 ft.; Base: approx. 30 in. × 3 ft. × 8 ft.	Erected by the Association Army of Tennessee, Louisiana Division, C.S.A. Louisiana's General P.G.T. Beauregard is entombed there.	
Volunteer Firemen's Monument	1887	Greenwood Cemetery (New Orleans, Louisiana)	White Carrara marble sculpture on Hallowell Maine granite base	Sculpture: approx. 6 × 2 × 2 ft.; Base: approx. 46 × 18 × 18 ft.		
William Jasper Monument	1888	Savannah, Georgia	Bronze sculpture and plaques on granite base	15 feet 6 inches		
National Monument to the Forefathers	1889	Plymouth, Massachusetts	Marble on granite base with marble reliefs	Sculpture: approx. H. 36 ft. (180 tons); Base: approx. H. 45 ft	Commissioned by the Pilgrim Society.	
James A. Garfield Memorial	1890	Lakeview Cemetery (Cleveland, Ohio)	Sculpture: Carrara marble on granite base	12 feet		
Horace Greeley Memorial	1890	Greeley Square (New York, New York)	Bronze sculpture on Quincy granite base	Sculpture: H. 7 ft.; Pedestal: H. 8 ft.		
Bison Fountain	1891	Iowa State Capitol (Des Moines, Iowa)	Bronze and granite sculpture on granite tile base			Image of sculpture
Henry W. Grady statue	1892	Henry Grady Square (Atlanta, Georgia)	Bronze sculpture on Georgia granite base			
Thomas H. Benton	1895–1897	National Statuary Hall, United States Capitol (Washington, D.C.)	Marble	H. 7 ft. 7 in.	Gift of the State of Missouri.	
Francis P. Blair Jr.	1895–1897	National Statuary Hall, United States Capitol (Washington, D.C.)	Marble	H. 7 ft. 6 in.		
John E. Kenna	1897–1901	National Statuary Hall, United States Capitol (Washington, D.C.)	Marble	H. 7 ft. 9 in.		
Alabama Confederate Monument	1898	Alabama State Capitol (Montgomery, Alabama)	Russellville limestone, granite, and bronze sculpture on Russellville limestone base	Sculpture: approx. 80 × 35 × 35 ft.; Base: approx. 5 1/2 × 40 × 40 ft.		
Iowa State Capitol Relief	1898	Iowa State Capitol (Des Moines, Iowa)	Bronze sculpture on granite base	Sculpture: approx. 5 ft. 4 in. × 6 ft. 5 in. × 6 in.; Base: approx. 9 ft. × 26 ft. × 30 ft. 2 in.	"A uniformed nineteenth century-era soldier stands at the center of the relief, holding a flagpole in his bent proper right arm and a rifle in his proper right hand. An eagle overhead bears a banner in its mouth on which is written the State motto. The decorative scrolling includes corn and wheat stalks."	
Richard W. Thompson Bust	1902	Vigo County Courthouse (Terre Haute, Indiana)	Bronze sculpture on Indiana limestone base	Sculpture: approx. 2 1/2 ft. × 36 in. × 20 in.; Base: approx. 7 ft. × 55 1/4 in × 44 1/4 in.		Image of sculpture
General Beauregard Equestrian Statue	1915	City Park (New Orleans, Louisiana)	Bronze sculpture on Stone Mountain granite base	20 feet	Removed and placed in city storage yard May 2017.	
General Charles G. Halpine portrait			Bronze sculpture on granite pedestal		Commissioned by the Grand Army of the Republic, Dahlgren Post, New York.	
James L. Ridgely sculpture			Bronze		Commissioned by the Sovereign Grand Lodge, Independent Order of Odd Fellows, Baltimore, Maryland.	
Aretas Blood mausoleum		Valley Cemetery, Manchester, New Hampshire	Granite			Image of mausoleum
Cross for Charles W. Gould tomb		Green-Wood Cemetery, Brooklyn, New York	Marble			
Austin Flint bas-relief portrait		Bellevue Hospital Center, New York, New York	Bronze			
