= Battle of Liberty Place Monument =

Monument in New Orleans, Louisiana, U.S.

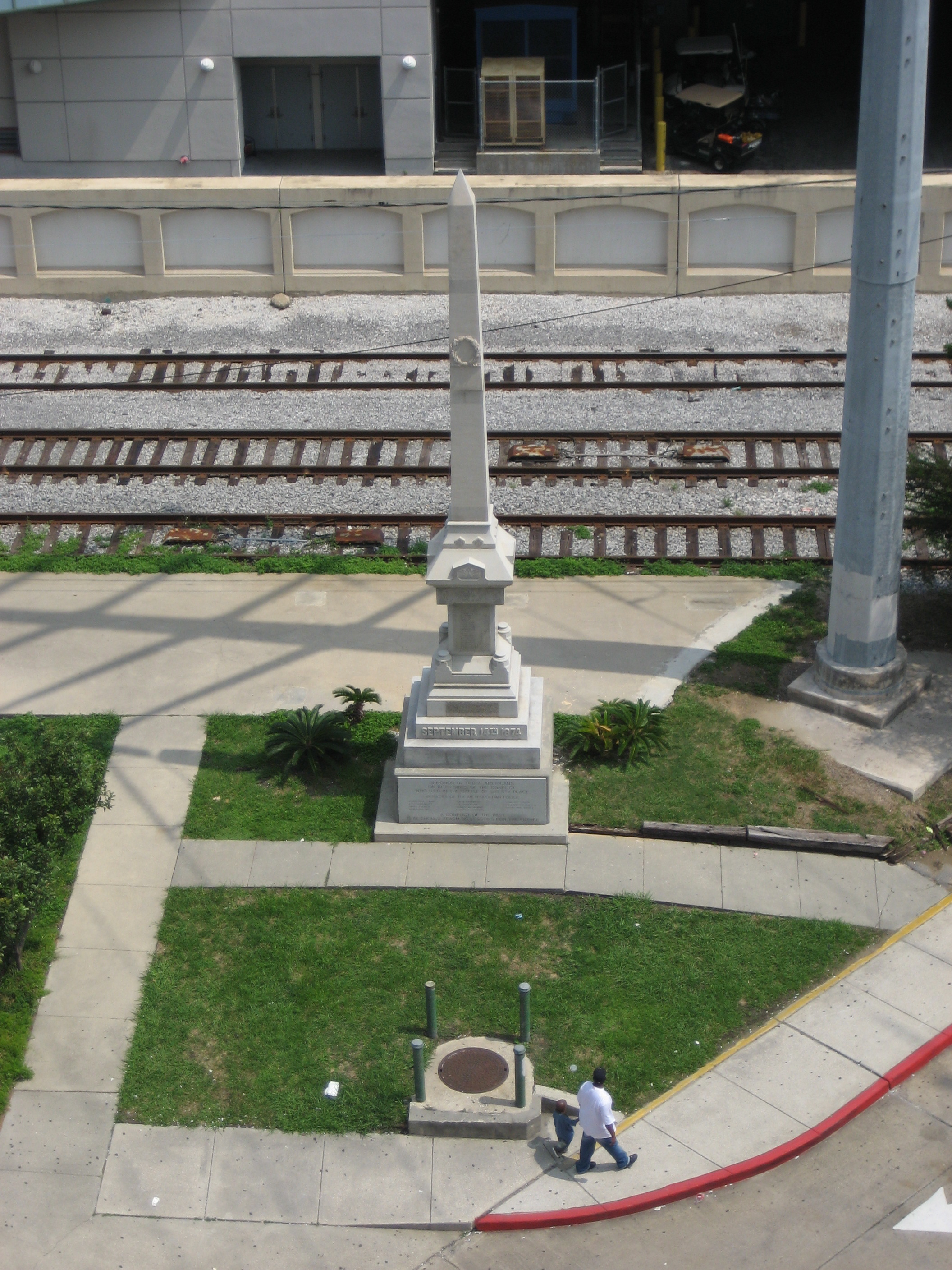
- Monument in 2006 in a less conspicuous location off Canal Street. It has since been moved to storage.
- Interactive map of Battle of Liberty Place Monument
- Location: New Orleans, Louisiana, U.S.
- Coordinates: 29°57′04″N 90°03′50″W
- Completion date: 1891
- Dismantled date: April 24, 2017

The Battle of Liberty Place Monument is a stone obelisk on an inscribed plinth, formerly on display in New Orleans, in the U.S. state of Louisiana, commemorating the "Battle of Liberty Place", an 1874 attempt by Democratic White League paramilitary organizations to take control of the government of Louisiana from its Reconstruction Era Republican leadership after a disputed gubernatorial election.

Erected in 1891 by a Southern Democratic-dominated city government in honor of the White League, the obelisk became the site of protests and rallies by both white supremacists and those who objected to it as a symbol of racism. It was removed in 2017 amid great controversy and threats of violence and was placed in storage.

== Background ==
The 1872 Louisiana gubernatorial election was a particularly contentious contest between Democrat John McEnery and Republican William Pitt Kellogg. In a close contest, Kellogg was declared the winner by outgoing Republican Henry C. Warmoth. Democratic forces in the state legislature succeeded in impeaching Warmoth after this action, and both Kellogg and McEnery claimed victory. Kellogg's win was later certified by the federal government. McEnery and his supporters continued to dispute the result, and in 1874 established a competing legislature. In September 1874, a paramilitary force called the White League entered the city (then the state capital) to forcibly unseat Kellogg. On September 19, they defeated city and state police and militia in the Battle of Liberty Place and occupied government buildings; they withdrew after President Ulysses S. Grant sent federal troops to the city.

== History ==
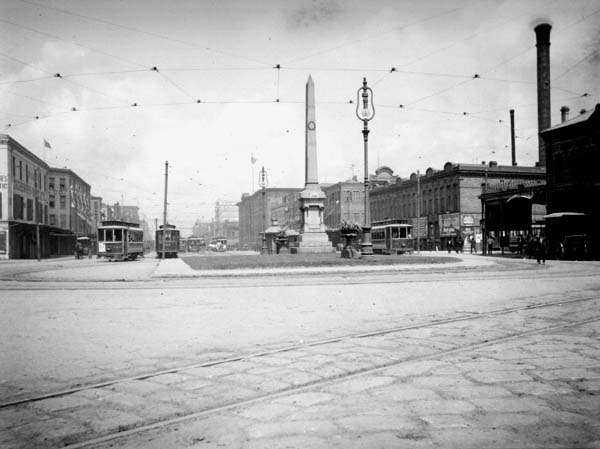
The monument in its original location on Canal Street, 1906

In 1891, as the Democratic-controlled legislature passed laws that disenfranchised most black Americans, the government of the City of New Orleans erected the Liberty Monument to "commemorate the uprising" of 1874, in the city. The monument was prominently placed in the neutral ground (median) near the foot of Canal Street. In 1932, inscriptions were added to the monument which attested to the battle's role in establishing white supremacy.

By the late 20th century, after civil rights achievements, many residents, especially in the black and Italian American communities, objected to the monument as a symbol of racism. (During the 1891 Hennessy affair, a New Orleans mob had lynched eleven Italian men; the lynching had helped revive the stalled fundraising campaign for the Liberty Place Monument.)

In 1965 the monument was dismantled and temporarily removed during major demolition and construction projects in the area. Already controversial, it was put back despite objections in 1970. It was subject to protests and vandalism with some regularity.

In 1974, the city government added a plaque at the foot of the monument that acknowledged the history but officially distanced the city from the racist philosophy of previous generations.

In 1976, the NAACP Youth Council formally called for the monument's removal. The Ku Klux Klan and other white nationalists used the monument as a rallying point.

In 1981, New Orleans mayor Ernest "Dutch" Morial called for the monument to be removed "because of what it symbolizes, has long been a source of divisiveness in our community" and "in the interest of public harmony, it is time to lay this monument to rest." The City Council blocked Morial's attempt to remove the monument but agreed to remove the inscription touting "white supremacy" in what was described as a "compromise."

In 1989, the monument was removed during major street work on Canal Street, and many residents opposed its return. The city tried to negotiate removing the inscriptions. Some people argued for the monument's restoration at the original location. The content of the inscriptions was seldom discussed; rather, the issues were dealt with on technical grounds. Historic preservation officials argued for its replacement; others argued that it was history that did not deserve commemoration.

On July 16, 1993, the New Orleans City Council voted 6 to 1 to declare the monument a nuisance. It was taken to a warehouse, with the intention to move it to an indoor museum. The council eventually permitted its installation at a less prominent location, a short distance off Canal Street (at the river end of Iberville Street) between the One Canal Place parking garage and a floodwall.

The white supremacist David Duke cited the monument as a symbol of "white pride" and, in 2004, tried to stage a rally by it. The monument was frequently vandalized as the target of anti-racist and anti-Nazi graffiti. It was one of three monuments vandalized in March 2012 by a group that noted the divisive nature of a monument favoring a racist past. The graffiti referenced the New Orleans Police Department killings of Justin Sipp and Wendell Allen as well as the killing of Trayvon Martin. A local businessman led his staff in cleaning up the monuments; he said that after Hurricane Katrina, residents needed to build the city together.

In July 2015, the Charleston church shooting caused many Southern states and communities to rethink the public display of Confederate symbols and monuments. New Orleans Mayor Mitch Landrieu called for the Liberty Place monument and statues honoring Robert E. Lee and other Confederate notables to be removed from prominent public spaces and explained "that's what museums are for." The idea drew both support and resistance, and the city council voted unanimously to hold public hearings to discuss the proposal.

In October 2016, on Mischief Night, a group of angry paraders converged on the monument. The monument was covered in antiracist graffiti and parts of the inscription were smashed with sledgehammers. When the police tried to intervene, they were attacked with paint, and a bonfire was lit. In December 2016, the council voted to remove the monument, and its move was upheld by a federal appeals court in March 2017.

Under the cover of darkness because of threats of violence, the monument was removed in the early hours of April 24, 2017, a day that was observed in Mississippi and Alabama as Confederate Memorial Day. With heavy police presence, workers wore bulletproof jackets and were protected by police snipers in the face of threats of violence. Mayor Landrieu stated that the statue would be moved into storage before being relocated into "a museum or other facility."

A seven-person Monument Relocation Committee was set up by Mayor LaToya Cantrell to advise on what to do with the removed monuments. The Battle of Liberty Place Monument will remain in storage.

== Inscriptions ==
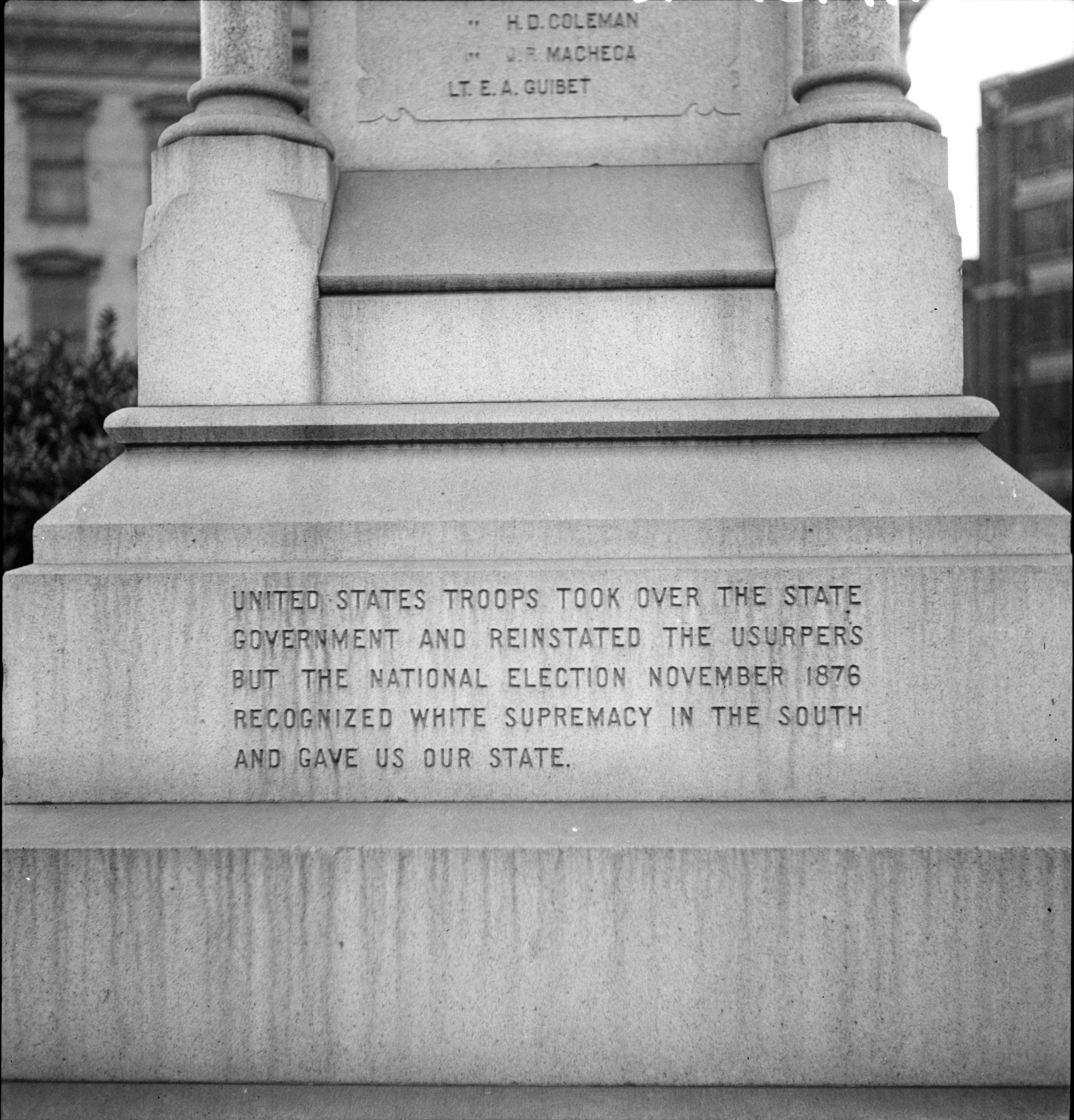
1936 photo by Dorothea Lange, who captioned her photo "One side of the monument erected to race prejudice. New Orleans, Louisiana".

The following inscription was added in 1932:

McEnery and Penn having been elected governor and lieutenant-governor by the white people, were duly installed by this overthrow of carpetbag government, ousting the usurpers, Governor Kellogg (white) and Lieutenant-Governor Antoine (colored). United States troops took over the state government and reinstated the usurpers but the national election of November 1876 recognized white supremacy in the South and gave us our state.

In 1974, the city government added an adjacent marker, which stated:

Although the "battle of Liberty Place" and this monument are important parts of the New Orleans history, the sentiments in favor of white supremacy expressed thereon are contrary to the philosophy and beliefs of present-day New Orleans.

When the monument was moved in 1993, some of the original inscriptions were removed, and replaced with new inscriptions that state in part:

In honor of those Americans on both sides who died in the Battle of Liberty Place ... A conflict of the past that should teach us lessons for the future.

== See also ==
- Removal of Confederate monuments and memorials

== Related sources ==
- The monument is featured in Lies Across America, a 1999 book by James Loewen.

Wagner, Jacob. A. 2004. The myth of Liberty Place: Race and Public Memory in New Orleans, 1874–1993. University of New Orleans ProQuest Dissertations Publishing, 2004. 3127791.
