= Greeley (surname) =

Greeley is a surname. Notable people with the surname include:

- Absalom Greeley (1823–1885), Canadian politician
- Andrew Greeley (1928–2013), American priest, sociologist, and author
- Arthur White Greeley (1875–1904), American physiologist and ichthyologist
- Bucky Greeley (born 1972), American football player
- Dana McLean Greeley (1908–1986), American Christian minister
- Edwin S. Greeley (1832–1920), American industrialist
- Elam Greeley (1818–1882), American politician
- Evelyn Greeley (1888–1975), American silent film actress
- Frederick Atwood Greeley (1896–1980), American astronomer
- George Greeley (1917–2007), Italian-American pianist and conductor
- Greg Greeley, American businessman
- Helen Hoy Greeley (1878–1965), American suffragist
- Henry Clay Greeley (1830-1902), American politician
- Horace Greeley (1811–1872), American newspaper editor, reformer and politician
- Isabel Greeley (1843–1928), American educator
- Jason Greeley (born 1977), Canadian singer-songwriter
- Jimmy Greeley (born 1945), Irish radio presenter
- Julia Greeley (birth year uncertain, died 1918), African-American ex-slave and philanthropist
- Jonathan Greeley (1741–1781), American sea captain
- Kym Greeley (born 1973), Canadian painter
- Martin Greeley (1814–1899), American politician
- Mellen Clark Greeley (1880–1981), American architect
- Mary Young Cheney Greeley (1811–1872), American suffragist
- Nixola Greeley-Smith (1880–1919), American journalist
- Olive A. Greeley (1901–1982), Astrophyisical assistant
- Ronald Greeley (1939–2011), American geologist and planetary scientist
- Samuel Arnold Greeley (1882-1968), American civil engineer
- William B. Greeley (1879–1955), American forester, third chief of the US Forest Service

== See also ==
- Greeley (disambiguation)
  - Horace Greeley (disambiguation)
- Greely (disambiguation)
- Greeley W. Whitford (1856–1940), American judge
