= Tributes to Horace Greeley =

The following are among the tributes to Horace Greeley, editor of the New-York Tribune and 1872 presidential candidate:

== Legacy and cultural references ==
=== Places Named After Greeley ===
- Places named after him include: Greeley, Pennsylvania, Greeley, Colorado, Greeley, Texas, Greeley, Kansas, Greeley County, Kansas (where there is also a city of Horace, and the county seat is Tribune), Greeley County, Nebraska (which also has a town named Horace), and Greeleyville, South Carolina.
- Horace Greeley High School in Chappaqua, New York, where his house is located, is also named for him. Paying homage to the 19th-century paper owned by Greeley, the high school named its newspaper the Greeley Tribune.

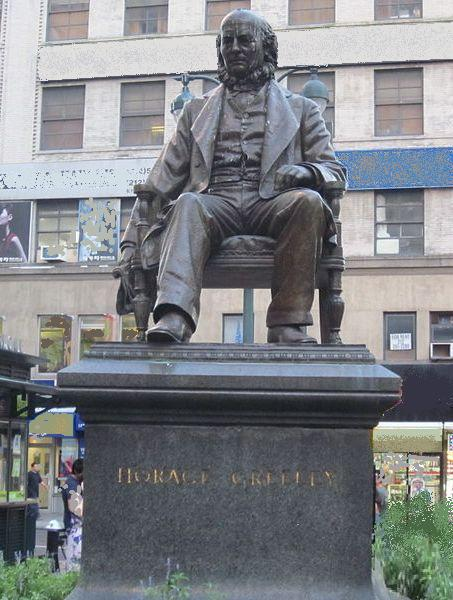
Horace Greeley Statue Greeley Square, NYC

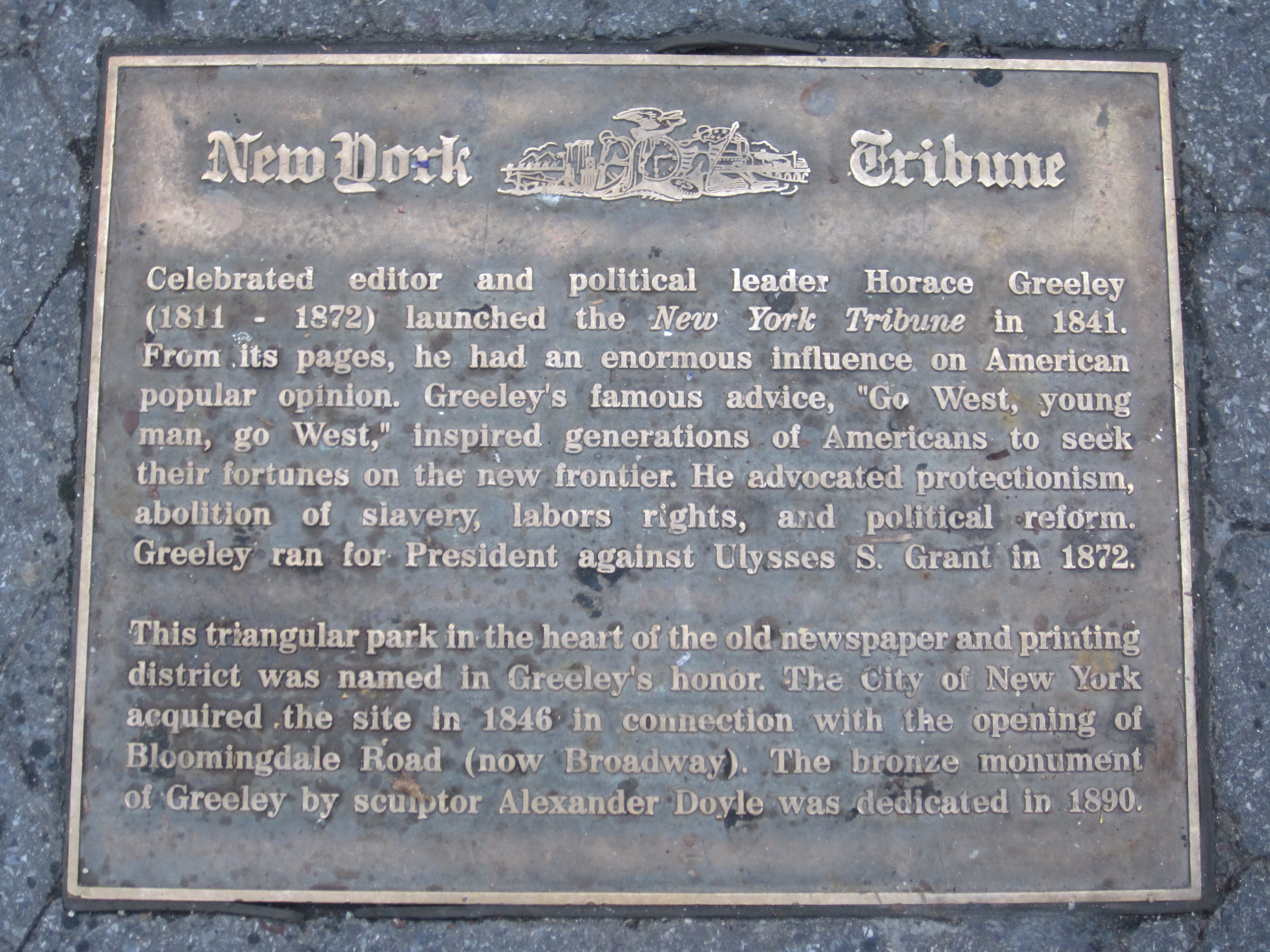
Plaque below Horace Greeley statue in New York City's Greeley Square

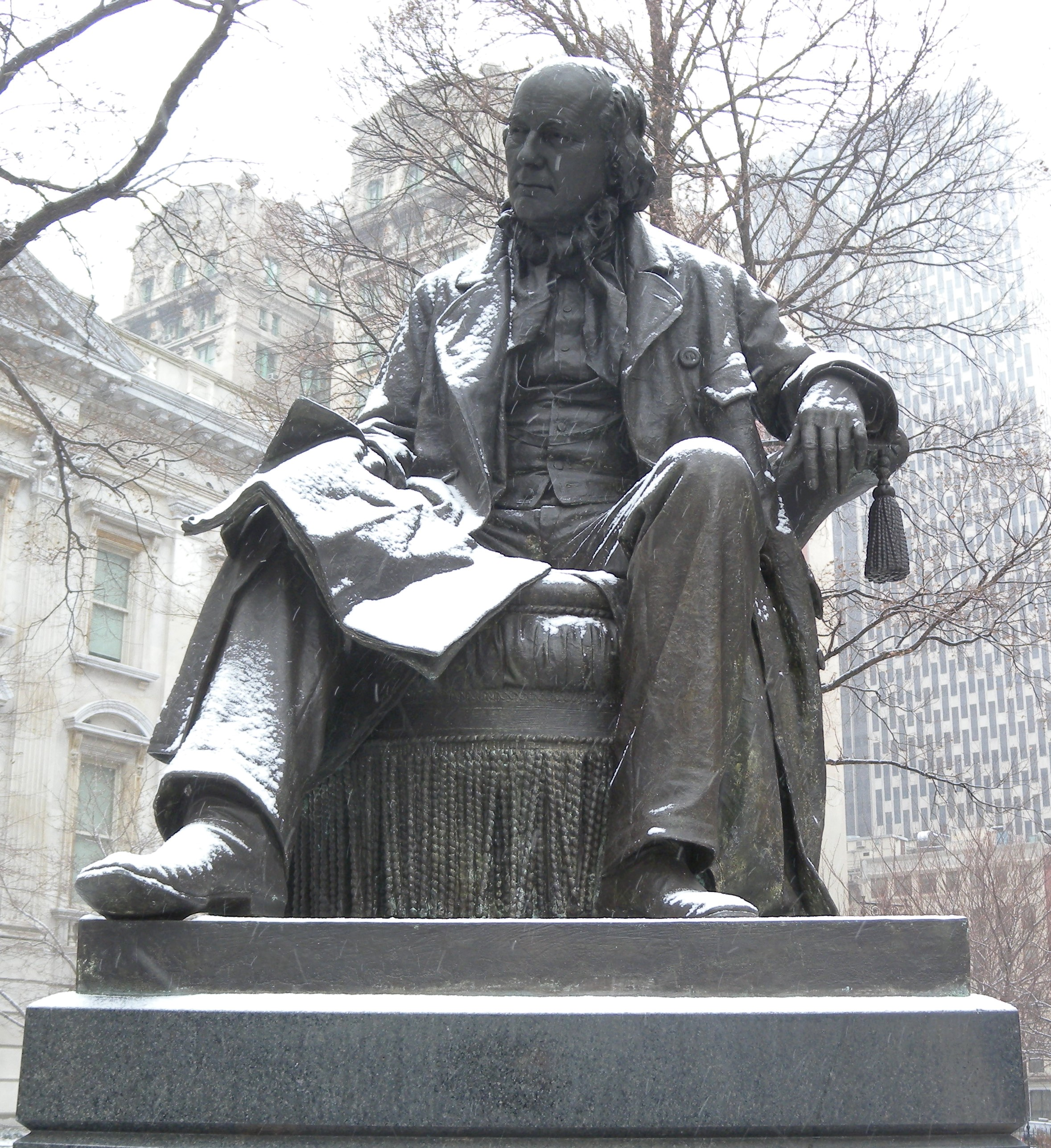
Horace Greeley Statue City Hall Park

- Horace Greeley Square is a small park in the Herald Square area of Manhattan featuring a seated statue of Greeley designed by Alexander Doyle and was dedicated in 1890. The park is next to the site of the former New York Herald building. There is a second seated statue of Greeley in Manhattan, this one in City Hall Park downtown.
- Mount Horace Greeley is one of the highest points in the Keweenaw Peninsula of Michigan.

=== Miscellaneous ===
- The Greeley House in Chappaqua, New York, now houses the New Castle Historical Society. The Greeley House was added to the National Register of Historic Places in 1979.

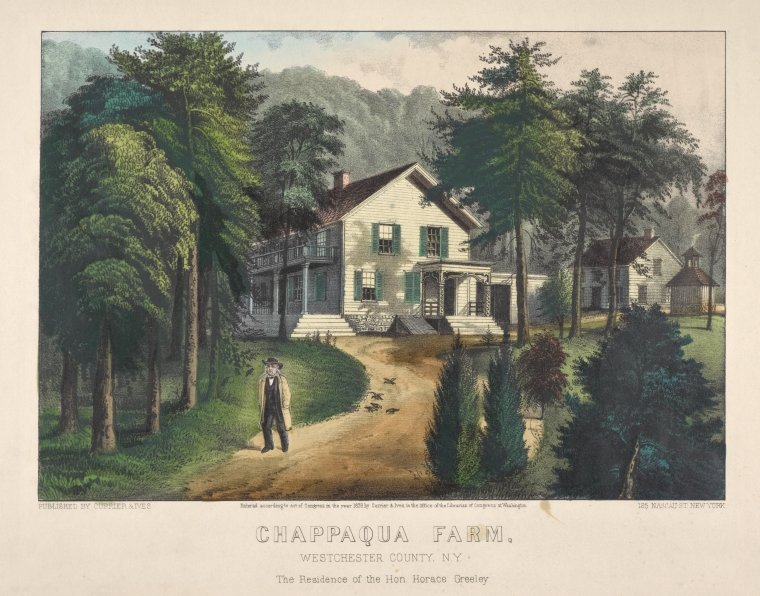
Chappaqua Farm, New York, Residence Horace Greeley, Currier & Ives, c. 1870

- In 1856, he designed and built Rehoboth, one of the first concrete structures in the United States.
- In the Publisher's Announcement in Volume III of Johnson's New Universal Cyclopaedia, A.J. Johnson stated, "the latest labors of Mr. Greeley's life were given to this work, to which he contributed largely. It is with justice, therefore, that his name is preserved in the list of its editors." Horace Greeley is listed as the editor for the topics American History, Statistics, Agriculture, etc.
- The New York Tribune building was the first home of Pace University. Today, the site where the building stood is now the One Pace Plaza complex of Pace's New York City campus. Coincidentally, Choate House, Dr. Choate's residence and private hospital, where Horace Greeley died, today is part of Pace's campus in Pleasantville, New York.
- On February 3, 1961, the US Post Office Department issued a 4-cent Horace Greeley Famous American stamp designed by Charles R. Chickering through the Chappaqua, New York, post office.

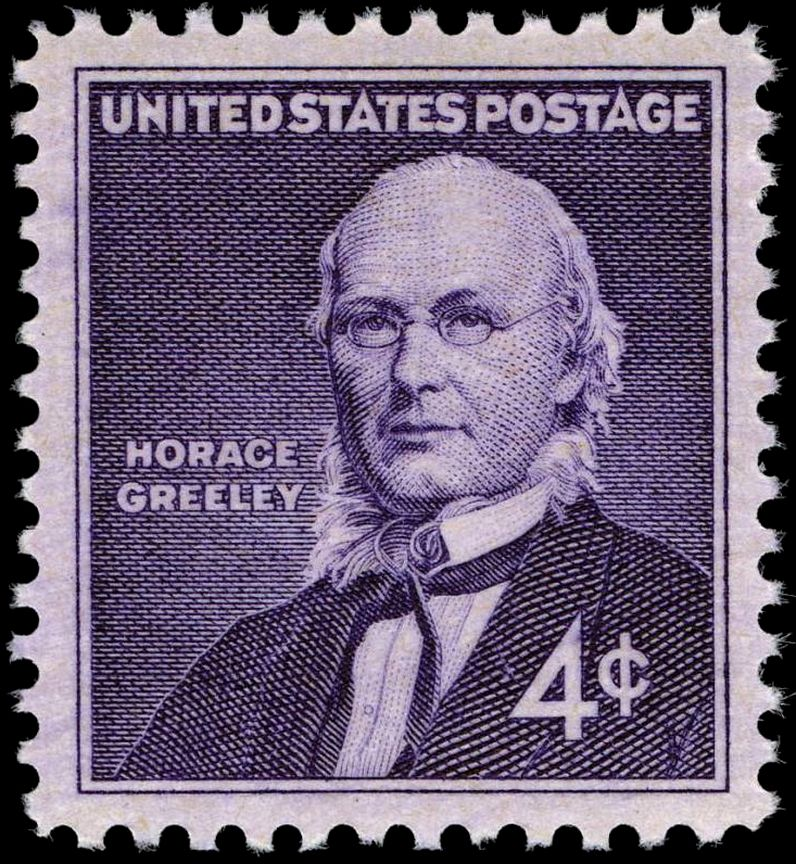
Horace Greeley honored on U.S. Postage stamp issue of 1961

- Greeley's birthplace is featured on a New Hampshire historical marker (number 3) along New Hampshire Route 101 in Amherst.
- Horace Greeley is the subject of an anecdote recounted by Mark Twain in his lectures to the public after his return from the Sandwich Islands. The story is also retold in Roughing It. In the story, which is really a story about a story, the narrator tells of coming west on the Overland Stage and how at almost every stop someone would board the stage and, after a while, offer to tell the same humorous anecdote about Horace Greeley. It is an example of redundancy or recursiveness as a humoristic story-telling device.
