= Greeley =

Greeley can refer to:

- Greeley (surname)

== Places in the United States ==
=== Counties ===
- Greeley County, Nebraska
- Greeley County, Kansas

=== Places ===
- Greeley, Colorado, a city
- Greeley, Iowa, a city
- Greeley, Kansas, a city
- Greeley, Kentucky, an unincorporated community
- Greeley, Minnesota, an unincorporated community
- Greeley, Missouri, an unincorporated community
- Greeley Center, Nebraska, a village, commonly shortened to Greeley
- Greeley, Pennsylvania

=== Other ===
- Greeley Estates, a band from Arizona
- Greeley House (Chappaqua, New York)
- Horace Greeley High School

== See also ==
- Greely (disambiguation)
  - Horace Greeley (disambiguation)
