= Creely =

Creely is a surname. Notable people with the surname include:

- John V. Creely (1839–1900), American politician
- Gus Creely (1870–1934), American baseball player

== See also ==
- Robert Creeley (1926–2005), American poet and author
- Greely (disambiguation)
