= Horace Greeley (disambiguation) =

Horace Greeley (1811–1872) was editor of the New-York Tribune and an 1872 presidential candidate.

Horace Greeley may also refer to:

== People ==
- Hjalmar Horace Greeley Schacht (1877–1970), German economist and politician
- Horace Greeley Burt (1849–1913), American railway executive
- Horace Greeley Knapp, American architect
- Horace Greeley Knowles (1863–1937), American politician
- Horace Greeley Martin (1873−1949), telegrapher and inventor of the Vibroplex telegraph key
- Horace Greeley Snover (1847–1924), American politician
- Horace Greeley Waldin (1851–1925), American statistician
- Horace Greeley (politician), Canadian territorial legislator from 1898 to 1905

== Sculptures ==
- Statue of Horace Greeley (City Hall Park), Manhattan, New York
- Statue of Horace Greeley (Herald Square), Manhattan, New York

== Other uses ==
- Horace Greeley High School, Chappaqua, New York
- Horace Greeley Award, New England award for public service journalism

== See also ==
- Tributes to Horace Greeley
- Horace Greeley presidential campaign, 1872
