= Statue of Horace Greeley (Herald Square) =

Statue in Manhattan, New York, U.S.

Horace Greeley
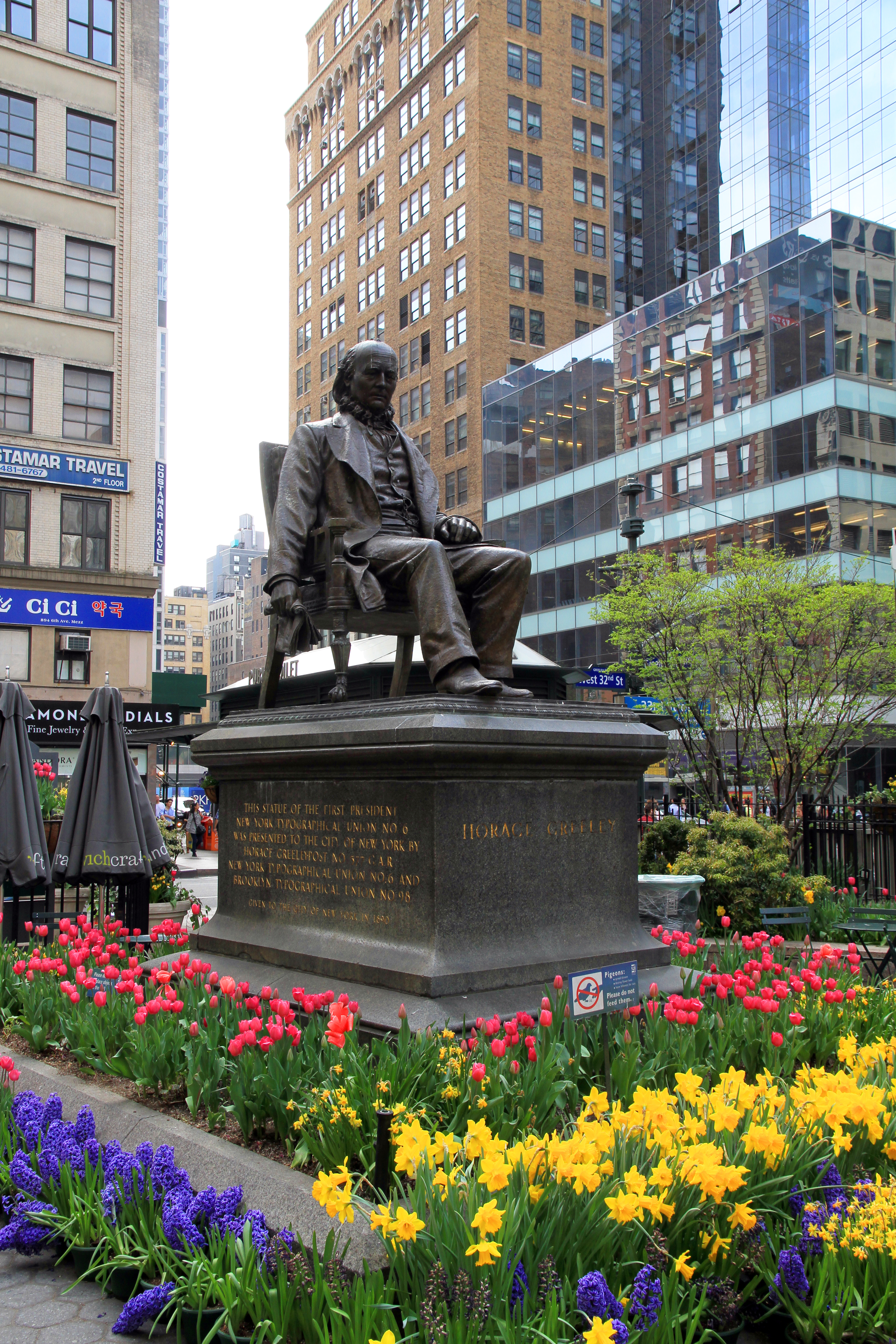
- The sculpture in 2013
- Artist: Alexander Doyle
- Year: 1894
- Type: Sculpture
- Medium: Bronze
- Subject: Horace Greeley
- Location: Manhattan, New York, United States; 40°44′54.9″N 73°59′18.1″W

Horace Greeley, also known as the Greeley Memorial, is an outdoor bronze sculpture of Horace Greeley by Alexander Doyle, located in Greeley Square Park in Manhattan, New York. The statue, cast in 1892 and dedicated on May 30, 1894, sits atop a Quincy granite pedestal. It contains the following inscription:

THIS STATUE OF THE FIRST PRESIDENT
NEW YORK TYPOGRAPHICAL UNION NO. 6
WAS PRESENTED TO THE CITY OF NEW YORK BY
HORACE GREELEY·POST NO. 577 G.A.R.
NEW YORK TYPOGRAPHICAL UNION NO. 6 AND
BROOKLYN TYPOGRAPHICAL UNION NO. 98

GIVEN TO THE CITY OF NEW YORK IN 1890

== See also ==
- Statue of Horace Greeley (City Hall Park), also located in Manhattan
- Tributes to Horace Greeley
