= Greely =

Greely may refer to:

== People ==
=== Surname ===
- Adolphus Greely (1844–1935), American polar explorer and United States Army officer
- Ann F. Jarvis Greely (1831–1914), American women's rights activist
- Aurora Greely (1905–1983), American choreographer
- Hannah Greely (born 1979), American artist
- Penny Greely, American wheelchair curler and sitting volleyball player
- Rose Greely (1883–1969), an American landscape architect

=== Given name ===
- Greely S. Curtis (1830–1897), American Civil War officer

== Places ==
- Greely, Ontario, Canada
- Fort Greely, U.S. Army missile launch site in Alaska
  - Fort Greely, Alaska, census-designated place surrounding Fort Greely

== See also ==
- Greeley (disambiguation)
  - Horace Greeley (disambiguation)
