= Mary Young Cheney Greeley =

American educator (1811–1872)

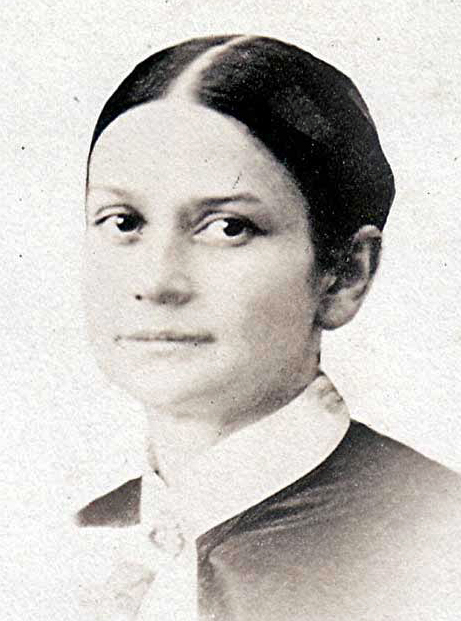
- Born: Mary Young Cheney; October 20, 1811; Litchfield, Connecticut, U.S.
- Died: October 30, 1872 (aged 61); New York City, U.S.
- Resting place: Green-Wood
- Known for: Wife of Horace Greeley; suffragette
- Movement: Suffrage
- Spouse: Horace Greeley (m. 1836)
- Children: 7 (5 died in childhood)

Mary Young Cheney Greeley (née Cheney; October 20, 1811 – October 30, 1872) was an American schoolteacher, suffragist, and spiritualist. She was the wife of newspaper editor Horace Greeley.

== Life ==
Greeley was born as Mary Young Cheney on October 20, 1811. Little is known of her early life. She was briefly a schoolteacher, and later an intermittent suffragist and spiritualist. She is reported to have been mentally unstable for much of her life. The date of her birth is uncertain, with some sources stating 1811 and others 1814.

She married Horace Greeley in Warrenton, North Carolina, on July 5, 1836. Early in their marriage he used her $5000 in savings to fund his first private newspaper. In 1867 Horace Greeley served as chair of the suffrage committee of the American Equal Rights Association convention. Horace Greeley was in favor of African American men gaining the right to vote, but did not support voting rights for women. He was unaware that his wife, Mary Greeley, had signed a petition in favor of women's suffrage and was made aware of that fact when it was announced on the floor of the convention.

The marriage was not a happy one, and her oppressive relationship with her husband colored her life. He had little say in the running of the house, and avoided his wife and their house. However, he kept her almost constantly pregnant, but took no responsibility for the children. Five of their seven children died quite young, at least some of them of neglect: firstborn son (born and died in 1838), second son (born and died in 1840), Arthur Young Greeley (1844–1849), Mary Inez Greeley (born and died in 1847), and Raphael Uhland Greeley (1851–1857). Mary also suffered at least two miscarriages, both in 1839. Only two children lived to adulthood: Ida Lillian Greeley Smith (1848–1882) and Gabrielle Rosamond Greeley Clendenin (1857–1937).

Greeley was an advocate of the Graham Diet and a Spiritualist. Her behavior suggests she may have had clinical depression and obsessive–compulsive disorder (OCD). She believed her son Arthur Young Greeley, known as "Pickie", was a spirit medium. She kept him isolated from the world and from other children, and constantly demanded that he relay communications from the afterlife. As he grew older he began to express a fierce anger towards his mother. After his death at age five from cholera, she hired the 11-year-old Kate Fox to stay at her house and contact him. Ms. Fox later wrote that she too disliked Mrs. Greeley intensely.

== Death ==
She suffered from "consumptive lung disease" for the last 20 years of her life, and died from it on October 30, 1872, ten days after her 61st birthday. Her husband, who was running for President of the United States at the time, died a month later.
