= City Hall Park =

Public park in Manhattan, New York

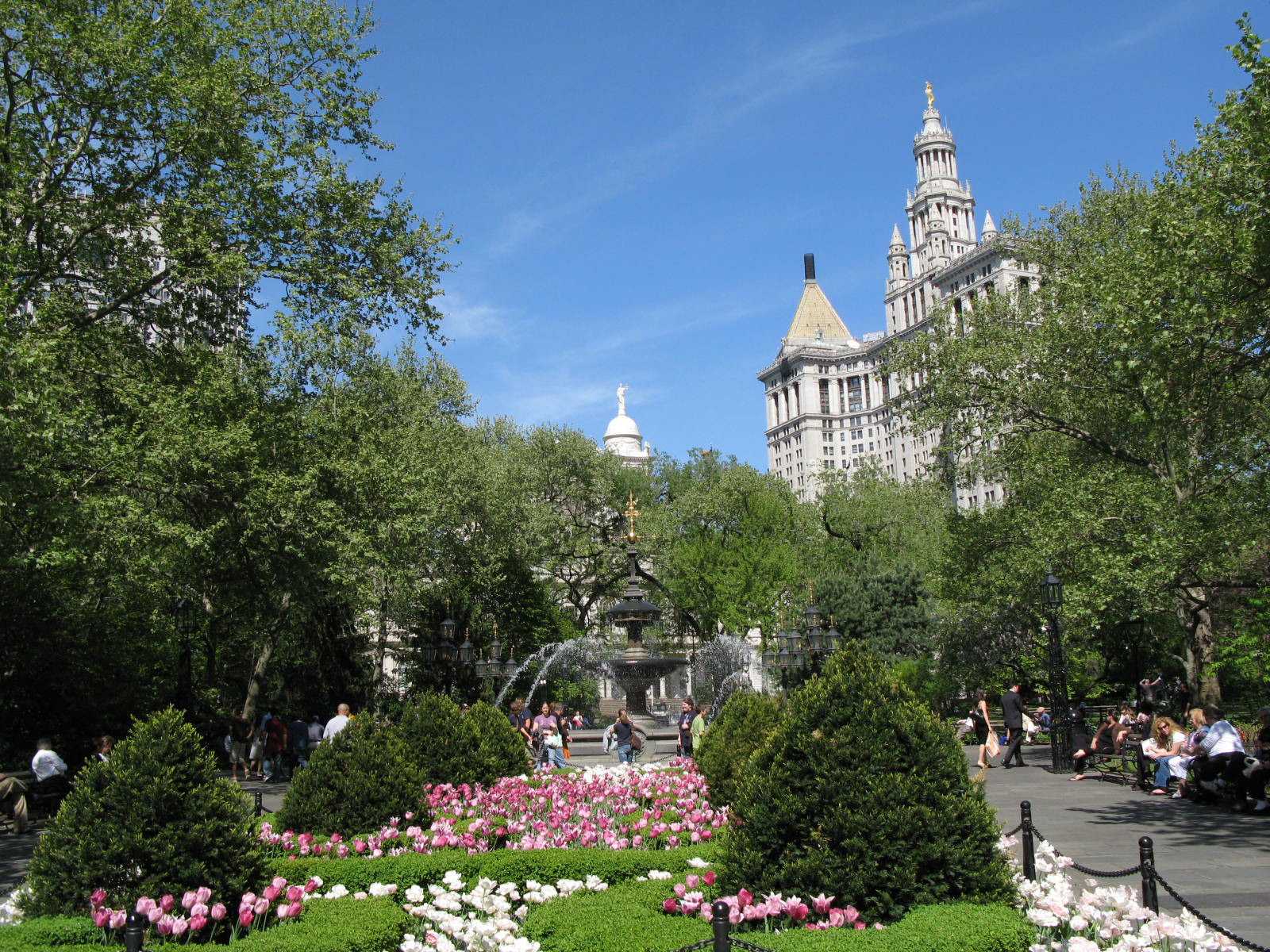
- The park in 2007
- Interactive map of City Hall Park
- Type: Public park
- Nearest city: New York City, New York, United States
- Coordinates: 40°42′44″N 74°00′26″W

City Hall Park is a public park surrounding New York City Hall in the Civic Center of Manhattan. It was the town commons of the nascent city of New York.

== History ==
=== 17th century ===
David Provoost came to New Netherland as early as 1638, probably with Governor Kieft. He held several positions and was appointed in 1652 as one of the nine men, elected by the people, to govern New Amsterdam He owned 35 acres (14 ha) around where City Hall Park is now situated.

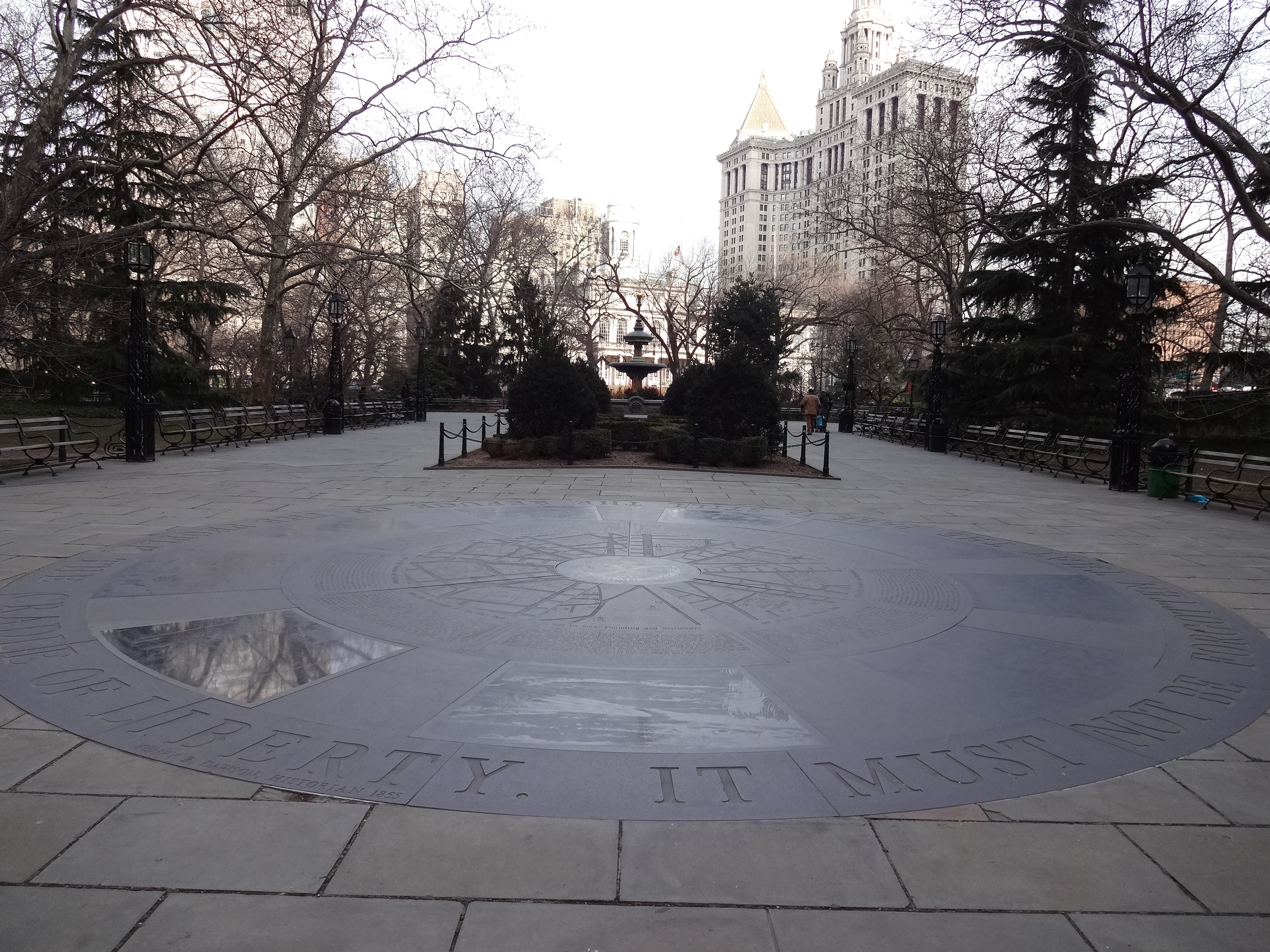
City Hall Park

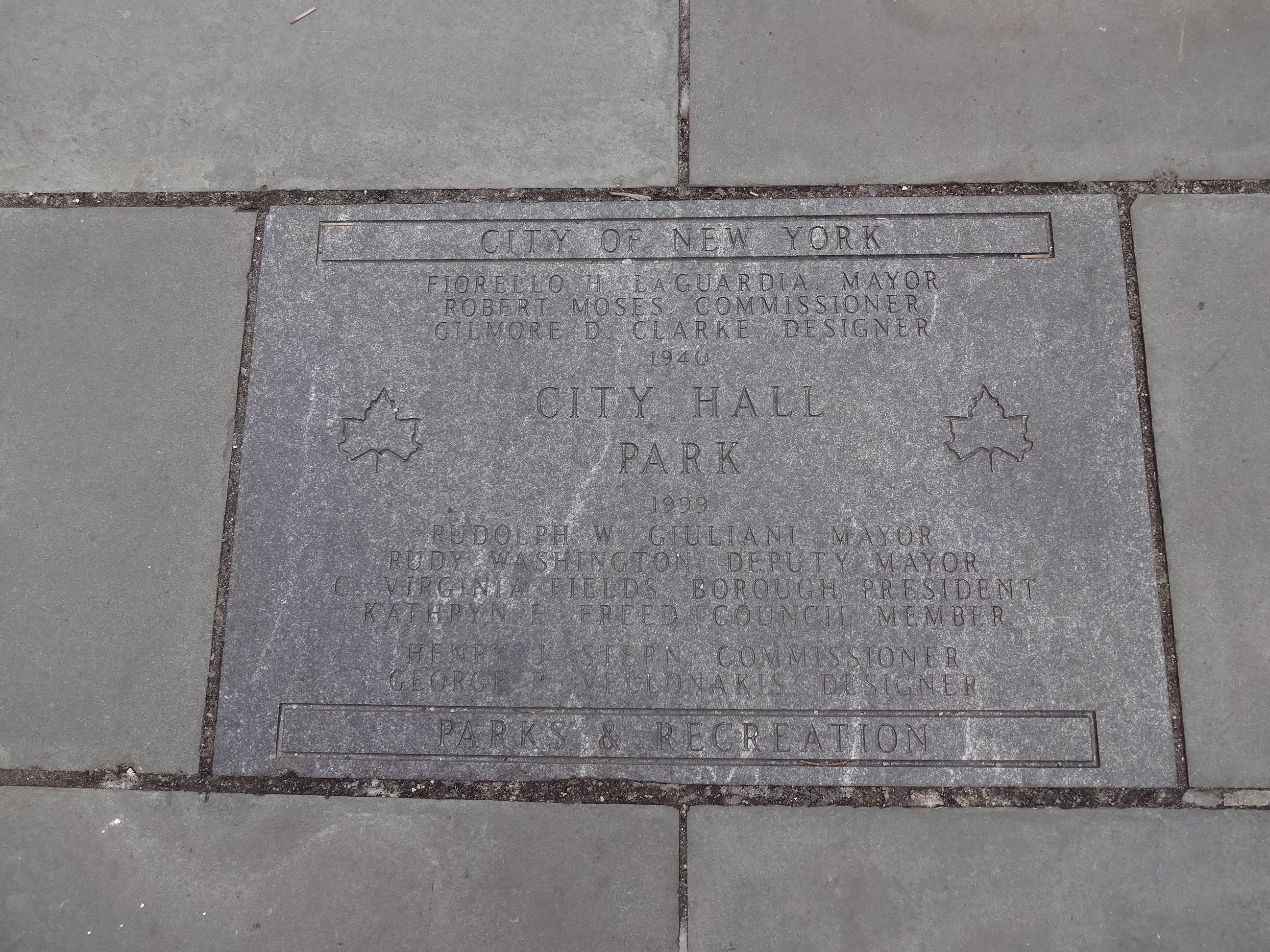
Sign at City Hall Park

=== 18th century ===
During the pre-Revolutionary era City Hall Park was the site of many rallies and movements. For instance, in 1765, New Yorkers protested the Stamp Act of 1765 at the site. On March 18, 1766, New Yorkers rejoiced when the Stamp Act was repealed.

In 1766, the Sons of Liberty erected the first “Liberty pole", a commemorative mast topped by a vane featuring the word “liberty", outside the Soldiers’ Barracks. British soldiers chopped it down, and it was replaced five times. A replica dating to 1921 now stands near its original location between City Hall and Broadway.

In 1766, St. Paul's Chapel was completed as a chapel of Lower Manhattan's Trinity Church. It stood in a field some distance from the growing port city to the south and was built as a "chapel-of-ease" for parishioners who did not live near the Mother Church. Two years later, construction began on the new Bridewell, a jail. American Prisoners of War would be held in the Bridewell during the British occupation of New York in the American Revolutionary War.

On July 9, 1776, units of the Continental Army and citizens gathered in the commons to hear the Declaration of Independence read by George Washington, while over 150 British ships and tens of thousands of troops were in the harbor. The Sons of Liberty led a crowd from there down Broadway to Bowling Green and tore down the gilt lead statue of George III of Great Britain there. On November 9, 1783, the American forces recaptured the Civic Center, and George Washington raised the flag in the park. Six years later, General Washington was named the president of the United States of America, and immediately after his inauguration, President Washington went to the renowned St. Paul's Chapel, the oldest surviving church in Manhattan.

=== 19th century ===
In 1802, since the original City Hall of New York City was aging and could not accommodate the growing municipal government, New York City's administration decided to hold a competition for the best new City Hall design. Aaron Burr promised Philadelphia's Benjamin Henry Latrobe that he would win. When he lost, Latrobe bitterly denounced the winners, “bricklayer” John McComb Jr. and French exile Joseph-François Mangin, and their “vile invention". In fact, McComb and Mangin were each accomplished architects, and their design was superior to Latrobe's, but City Hall was their only collaboration, and it was brief. McComb alone oversaw construction and subsequent changes to the design, and Mangin's career seems to have faltered. Decades later, a McComb descendant erased Mangin's name from the original drawings, but Mangin's name was added to the cornerstone of City Hall in 2003. The building was completed in 1812; it was designed in a Federal style with French influence. It was sited to be north of the heart of the city at the time.

By the late 1810s, New York's cultural identity was growing, and in 1818, The Rotunda was built as New York City's first art museum.

Slavery was abolished in New York on July 4, 1827, Emancipation Day, prompting a two-day celebration in the park and a parade.

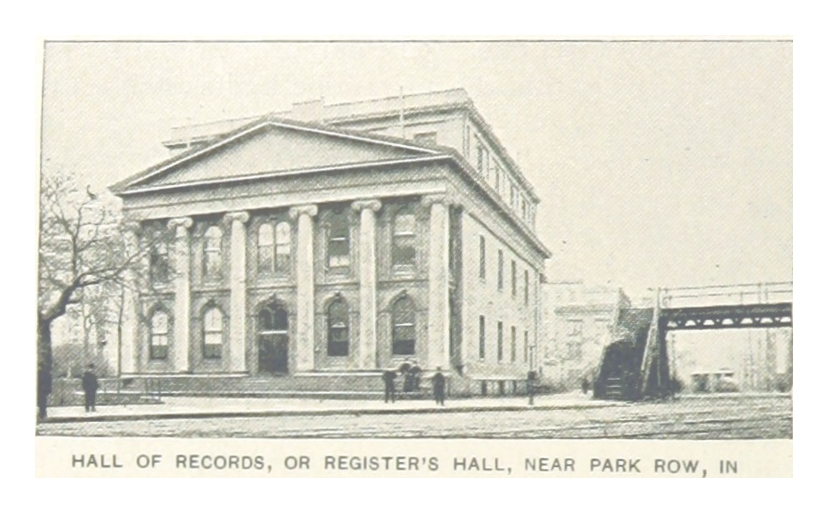
Hall of Records, 1893

In 1830, the old debtor prison, New Gaol, was transformed into the city's hall of records. When the building was torn down in 1903, it was New York's oldest municipal building.

New York City's lavish architecture and growing economy attracted tourists, and in 1836, the first New York City luxury hotel was built. Isaiah Rogers, with a reputation for building America's first luxury hotel, designed the six-story Park Hotel, which was commonly known as the Astor House.

In 1842, the Croton Fountain was placed in the center of City Hall Park to celebrate the Croton Aqueduct, New York City's first dependable supply of pure water. The aqueduct drew water from the Croton Dam more than 40 miles (64 km) north of the city and was considered one of the great engineering feats of the 19th century.

Starting in 1861, the Tweed Courthouse was built in the northern portion of the park. The courthouse was widely seen as a symbol of corruption because it was built using funds provided by the corrupt William M. "Boss" Tweed, whose Tammany Hall political machine controlled the city and state governments at the time. It was completed in 1881, twenty years after construction started.

== See also ==
- Statue of Horace Greeley (City Hall Park)
