= Statue of Horace Greeley (City Hall Park) =

Statue in Manhattan, New York, U.S.

Horace Greeley
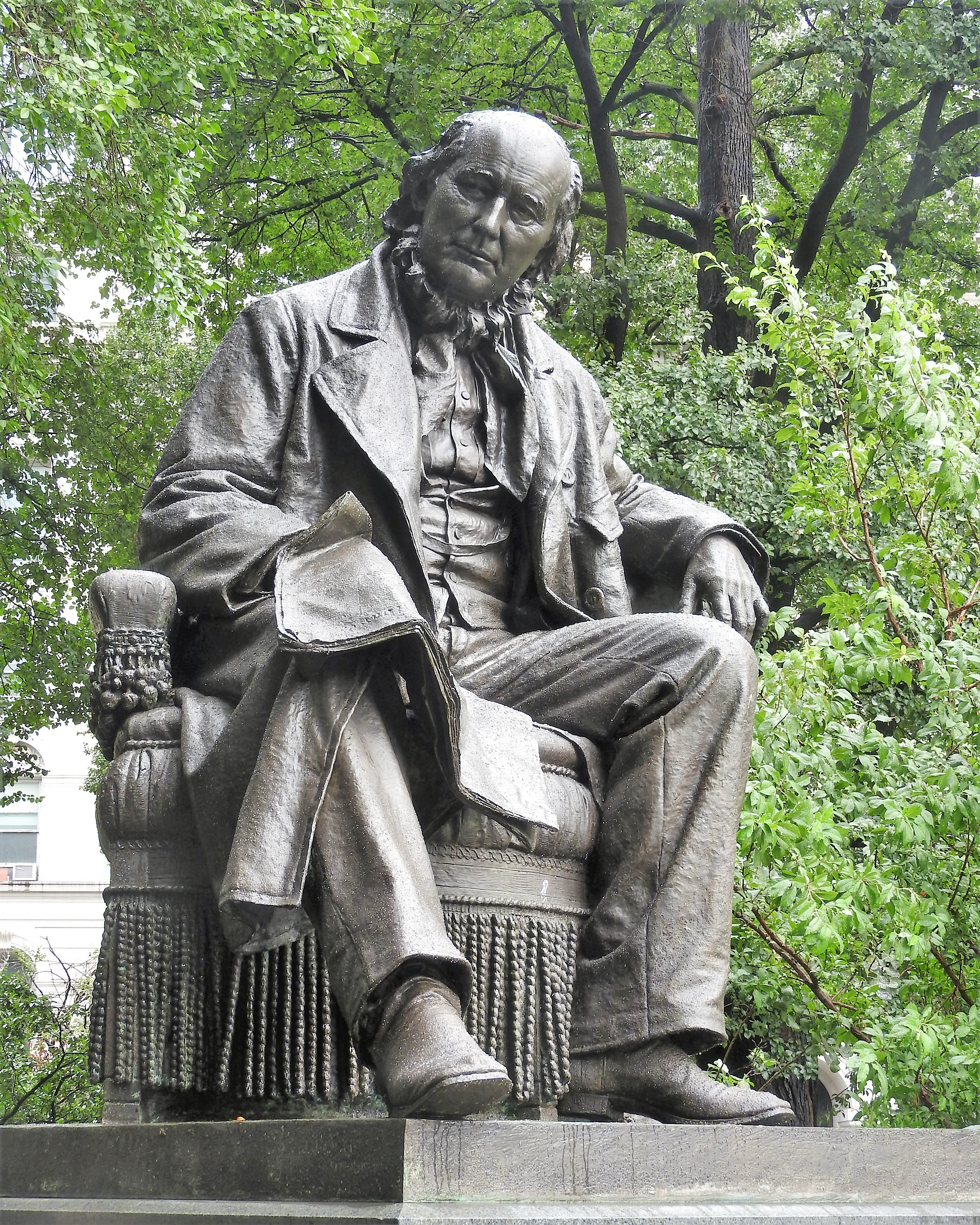
- The sculpture in 2018
- Artist: John Quincy Adams Ward
- Year: 1916
- Type: Sculpture
- Medium: Bronze
- Subject: Horace Greeley
- Location: Manhattan, New York, United States; 40°42′46.6″N 74°0′17.6″W

An outdoor bronze sculpture of Horace Greeley by artist John Quincy Adams Ward and architect Richard Morris Hunt is located in City Hall Park in Manhattan, New York. Cast in 1890, the seated statue is set on a Quincy granite pedestal. It was moved to its present location in 1905.

== History ==
The statue was dedicated outside the New York Tribune Building, just east of City Hall Park, on September 20, 1890. The statue was ordered to be moved in 1915 because it projected from Tribune Building's lot line, and because the building's ground-floor space behind the statue had been leased. The statue was moved to City Hall Park on June 19, 1916.

== See also ==
- Tributes to Horace Greeley
