= List of people from Bath, Maine =

The following list includes notable people who were born or have lived in Bath, Maine.

== Authors and academics ==
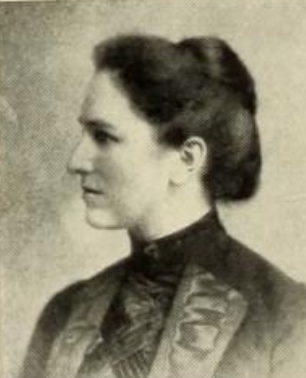
Eleanor P. Cushing

- McDonald Clarke, poet
- Glenn Cummings, economist, politician and University of Southern Maine president
- Eleanor P. Cushing, mathematics professor at Smith College
- Alice May Douglas, poet and author
- George F. Magoun, first president of Iowa College (now Grinnell College)
- Edward Page Mitchell, editorial and short story writer
- William Maxwell Reed, author of children's science books
- Susan Marr Spalding (1841–1908), poet
- Geoffrey Wolff, novelist, essayist, biographer, and travel writer; lives in Bath

== Business ==
- Charles W. Morse, businessman

== Media and arts ==
- Georgia Cayvan, stage actress
- Claude Demetrius, songwriter
- Emma Eames, singer
- Chad Finn, sportswriter
- John Adams Jackson, sculptor
- William Zorach, sculptor and painter

== Military ==
- Charles Frederick Hughes, US Navy admiral
- William Smith, US Army private, Medal of Honor recipient
- Silas Soule, abolitionist and Civil War era soldier, whistleblower

== Politics ==
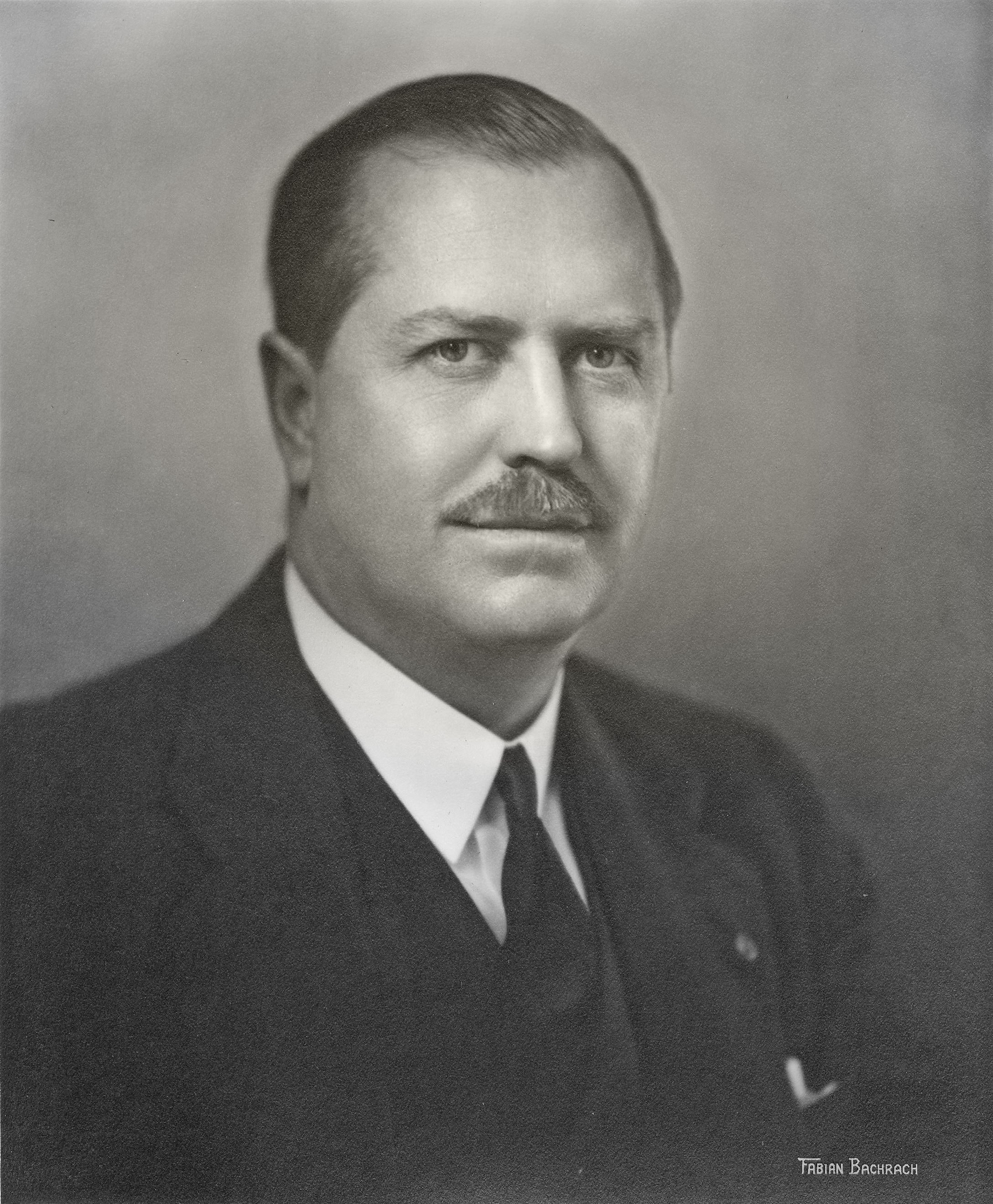
Sumner Sewall

- Nathaniel S. Berry, 28th governor of New Hampshire
- Samuel Davis, US congressman
- Thomas W. Hyde, US senator; Union Army general and Medal of Honor recipient; founder of Bath Iron Works
- William King, first governor of Maine
- Arthur Mayo, state legislator
- Freeman H. Morse, US congressman and mayor
- Amos Nourse, physician and US senator
- William LeBaron Putnam, lawyer and politician
- Harold M. Sewall, last United States Minister to Hawaii
- Sumner Sewall, 58th governor of Maine
- David Sinclair, politician and resident of Bath
- Mary Small, politician
- Francis B. Stockbridge, US senator
- Peleg Tallman, US congressman

== Science and engineering ==
- Edward Davis, buccaneer and engineer
- Francis H. Fassett, architect
- Henry Gannett, geographer
- George Edward Harding, architect
- Robert Jaffe, physicist, Professor of Physics at MIT
