= Statue of Francis Harrison Pierpont =

Statue in the U.S. Capitol

Francis Harrison Pierpont
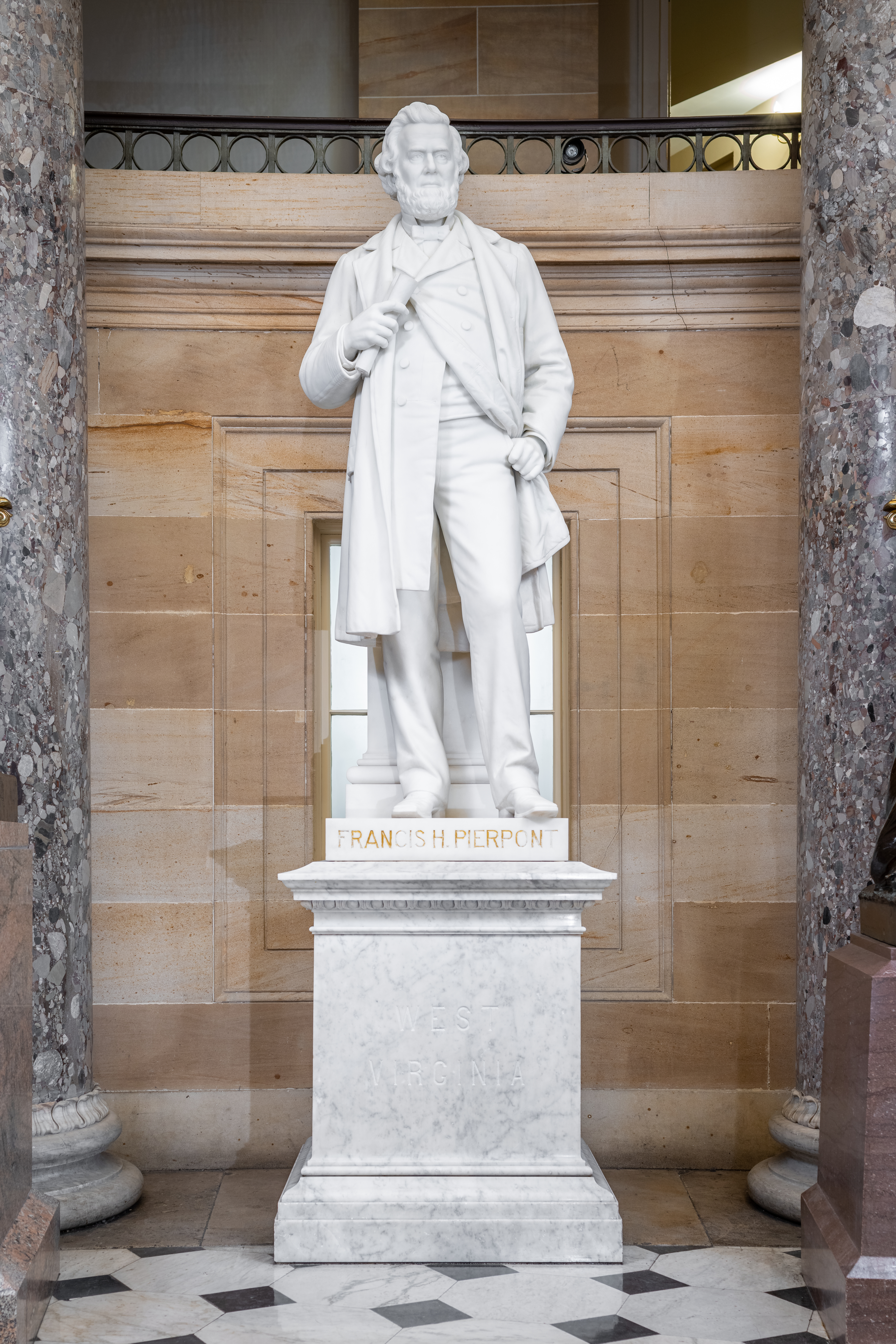
- The statue at the National Statuary Hall in 2023
- Artist: Franklin Simmons
- Medium: Marble sculpture
- Subject: Francis Harrison Pierpont

Francis Harrison Pierpont is a 1910 marble sculpture of Francis Harrison Pierpont by Franklin Simmons installed in the United States Capitol, in Washington, D.C., as part of the National Statuary Hall Collection. It is one of two statues donated by the state of West Virginia. The sculpture was unveiled by the Hon. Thomas Condit Miller, on April 27, 1937.

The statue is one of three that Simmons has placed in the collection, the others being William King, from Maine and Roger Williams from Rhode Island.

== See also ==
- 1910 in art
