= Alice Douglas =

Alice Douglas may refer to:

- Allie Vibert Douglas (1894–1988), Canadian astronomer and astrophysicist
- Alice May Douglas (1865–1943), American author, newspaper editor, and peace activist
