= 1820 Maine gubernatorial election =

- April 3, 1820
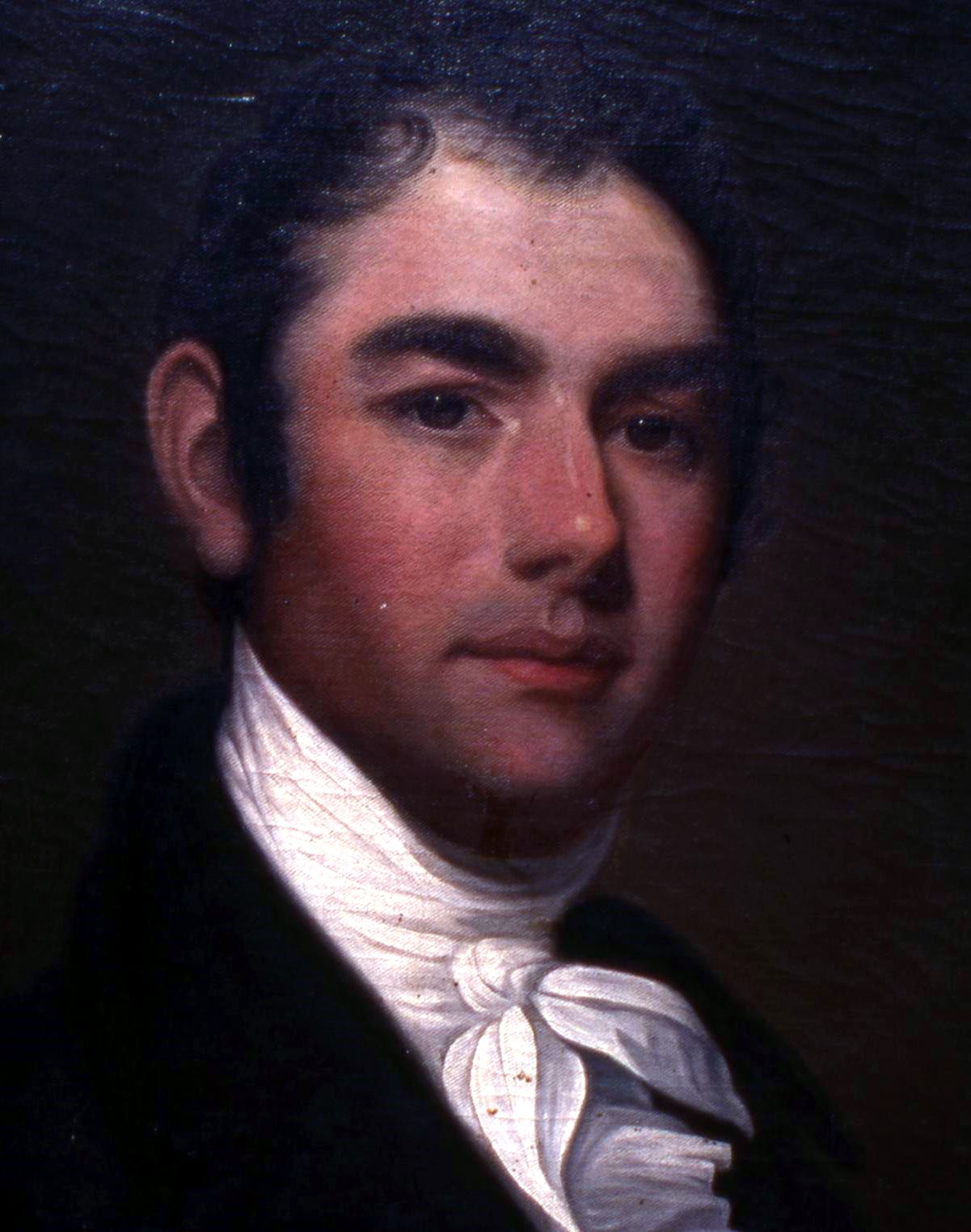
Candidate	William King
Party	Democratic-Republican
Popular vote	21,083
Percentage	95.34%
- County results King: 80–90% 90–100% No Data/Vote
Governor before election
John Brooks
as Governor of Massachusetts
Federalist
Elected Governor
William King
Democratic-Republican

The 1820 Maine gubernatorial election took place on April 3, 1820. It was the first election for Governor of Maine, taking place after Maine separated from Massachusetts and was recognized as a state on March 15, 1820. Maine's separation from Massachusetts came as a result of The Missouri Compromise. The new Constitution of Maine kept some aspects of the Massachusetts form of government such as the Executive Council and the term of office only being one year.

The election saw the virtually unanimous election of William King, the primary leader of the push for Maine statehood. He had no opponents.

== Results ==
1820 Gubernatorial Election, Maine
Party	Candidate	Votes	%
Democratic-Republican	William King	21,083	95.34
Write-in		1,031	4.66
Total votes		22,114	100.0

== Aftermath ==
King was inaugurated on June 2, 1820. He did not complete his term as President James Monroe appointed King to serve as a member of the Spanish Claims Commission to help formalize border changes caused by the Adams–Onís Treaty. He resigned the office on April 28, 1821. Maine does not have a lieutenant governor, so under the rules of succession the President of the Maine Senate William D. Williamson became the next governor.
