= Franklin Simmons =

American sculptor

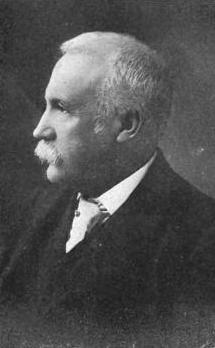
Simmons, sculptor

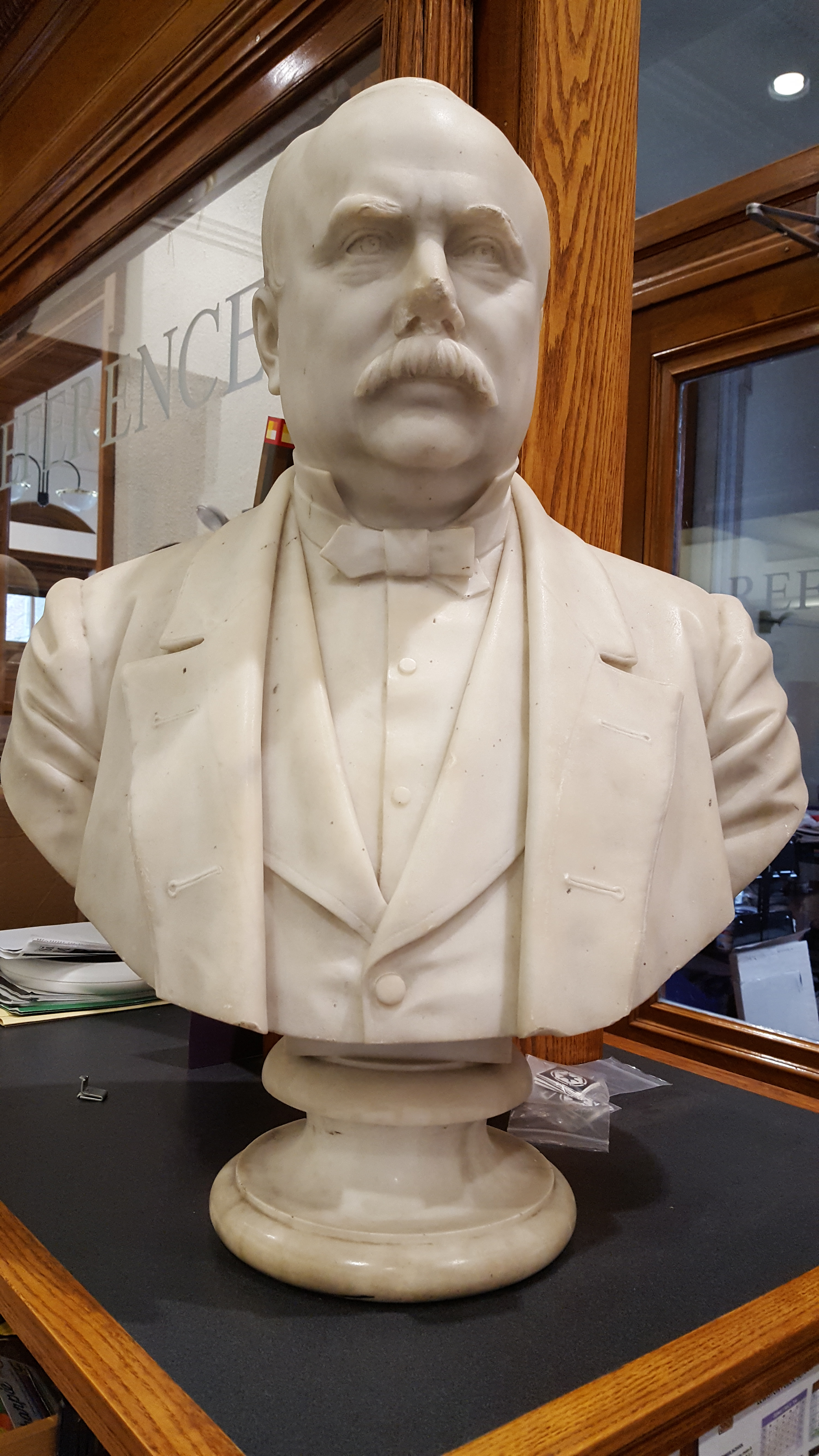
Bust of William B. Wood. Located in the Reference Department of the Lewiston Public Library.

Franklin Bachelder Simmons (January 11, 1839 – December 8, 1913) was a prominent American sculptor of the nineteenth century. Three of his statues are in the National Statuary Hall Collection, three of his busts are in the United States Senate Vice Presidential Bust Collection, and his statue of Ulysses S. Grant is in the United States Capitol Rotunda.

== Biography ==
Simmons was born in Webster, Maine, now known as Sabattus, Maine. He spent most of his childhood in Bath, Maine and Lewiston, Maine. He attended Bates College (then called the Maine State Seminary) in 1858. Simmons started sculpting and painting during childhood. He studied with John Adams Jackson.

During the last two years of the American Civil War, he moved to Washington, D.C., and modeled 24 portrait medallions of President Abraham Lincoln, his Cabinet, and generals and admirals. The Union League of Philadelphia purchased most of the medallions. In 1867 Simmons received an honorary A.M. from Bates College and from Colby.

Simmons went to live in Rome in 1868, but returned several times. Among his portrait busts are those of David D. Porter, James G. Blaine, Francis Wayland, and Ulysses S. Grant (1886). He is said to have made a female statue of The Wanderer, meant to depict a Jewess wandering in the desert. He died in Rome, aged 74, and is buried in the Protestant Cemetery.

== Selected works ==
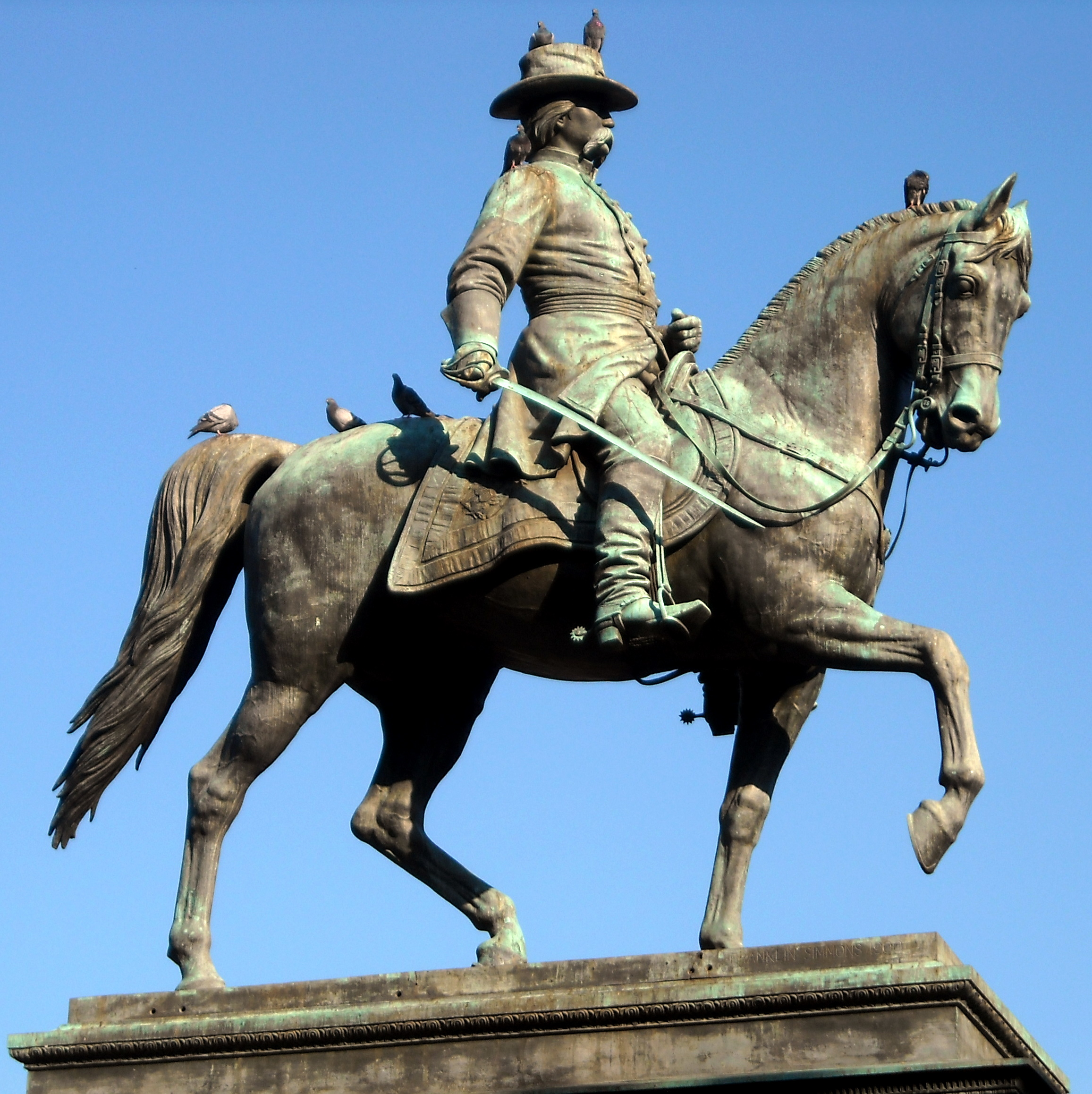
Equestrian Statue of Major General John A. Logan (1892–1901), Logan Circle, Washington, D.C.

- Bust of Oren Cheney (1861?), Bates College, Lewiston, Maine. Simmons sculpted this while a student at Bates College.
- Soldiers' Monument (1866–68), Kennedy Park, Lewiston, Maine.
- Soldiers' and Sailors' Monument (1867–69), Bellingham Square, Chelsea, Massachusetts.
- Penelope (marble, 1896), De Young Museum, San Francisco, California. Copies are at the Berkshire Museum in Pittsfield, Massachusetts; Lake Delaware Farm in Delhi, New York; the Detroit Institute of Arts; and the Portland Museum of Art in Portland, Maine.
- Jochebed with the Infant Moses (marble, 1873), Museum of Fine Arts, Boston, Massachusetts.
- The Promised Land (marble, 1874), Metropolitan Museum of Art, New York City.
- Roger Williams Monument (bronze, 1874–77), Roger Williams Park, Providence, Rhode Island. A bronze copy of his marble statue at the U.S. Capitol.
- Edward T. Little (bronze, 1875–77), Edward Little High School, Auburn, Maine.
- Bust of William B. Wood (marble, 1860), Lewiston Public Library, Lewiston, Maine
- Bust of Lyman Nichols (marble, 1860), Lewiston Public Library, Lewiston, Maine
- Bust of Admiral David Dixon Porter (marble, 1876), United States Naval Academy, Annapolis, Maryland.
- Miriam (year?)
- Medusa (1882)
- Galatea (1884)
- Senator Oliver P. Morton (bronze, 1884), Soldiers' and Sailors' Monument, Indianapolis, Indiana.
- The Seraph Abdiel (from "Paradise Lost") (1886).
- Henry Wadsworth Longfellow (bronze, 1887), Longfellow Square, Portland, Maine.
- Soldiers' and Sailor's Monument (1888–91), Monument Square, Portland, Maine; Richard Morris Hunt, architect.
- Bust of Robert Treat Paine (marble, 1892), Museum of Fine Arts, Boston, Massachusetts.
- Equestrian Statue of Major General John A. Logan, cast in Rome by Alessandro Nelli (bronze, 1892–1901), Logan Circle, Washington, D.C., Richard Morris Hunt, architect.
- Alexander Hamilton (bronze, 1905–06), Great Falls of the Passaic Overlook Park, Paterson, New Jersey.
- Valley Forge (Seated Washington) (bronze, 1910), Washington Memorial Chapel, Valley Forge, Pennsylvania.

=== Union League of Philadelphia ===
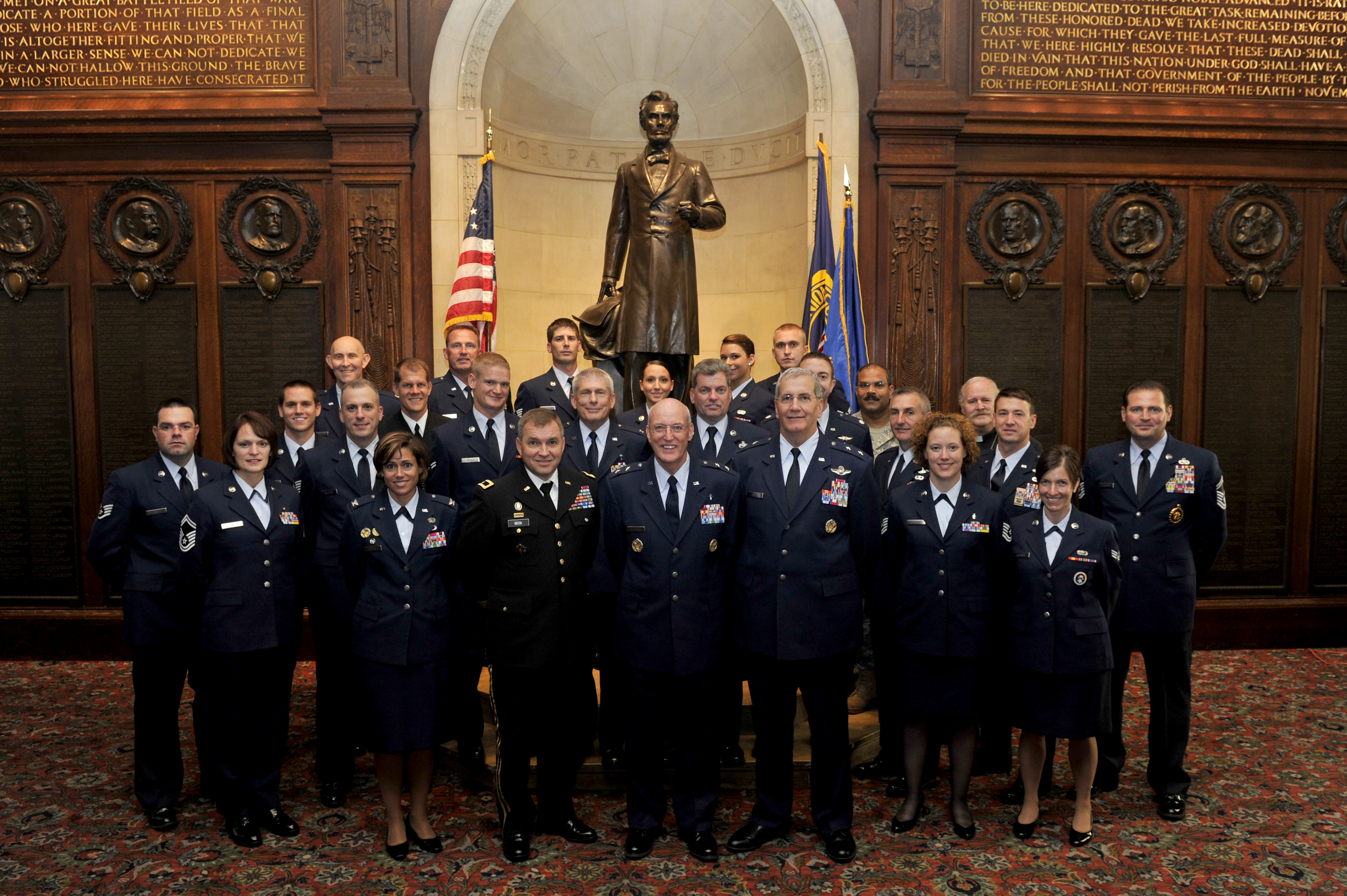
Civil War portrait medallions (1865), Union League of Philadelphia

- 14 bronze portrait medallions of Civil War generals and politicians (1865).
  - President Abraham Lincoln
  - Secretary of the Treasury Salmon P. Chase
  - Secretary of State William H. Seward
  - Major General Nathaniel P. Banks
  - Major General Ambrose Burnside
  - Major General Benjamin F. Butler
  - Major General Darius N. Couch
  - Major General Abner Doubleday
  - General of the Army Ulysses S. Grant
  - Major General Winfield S. Hancock
  - Major General Joseph Hooker
  - Major General Philip Kearny
  - Major General George Gordon Meade
  - Major General John Grubb Parke

=== United States Capitol ===
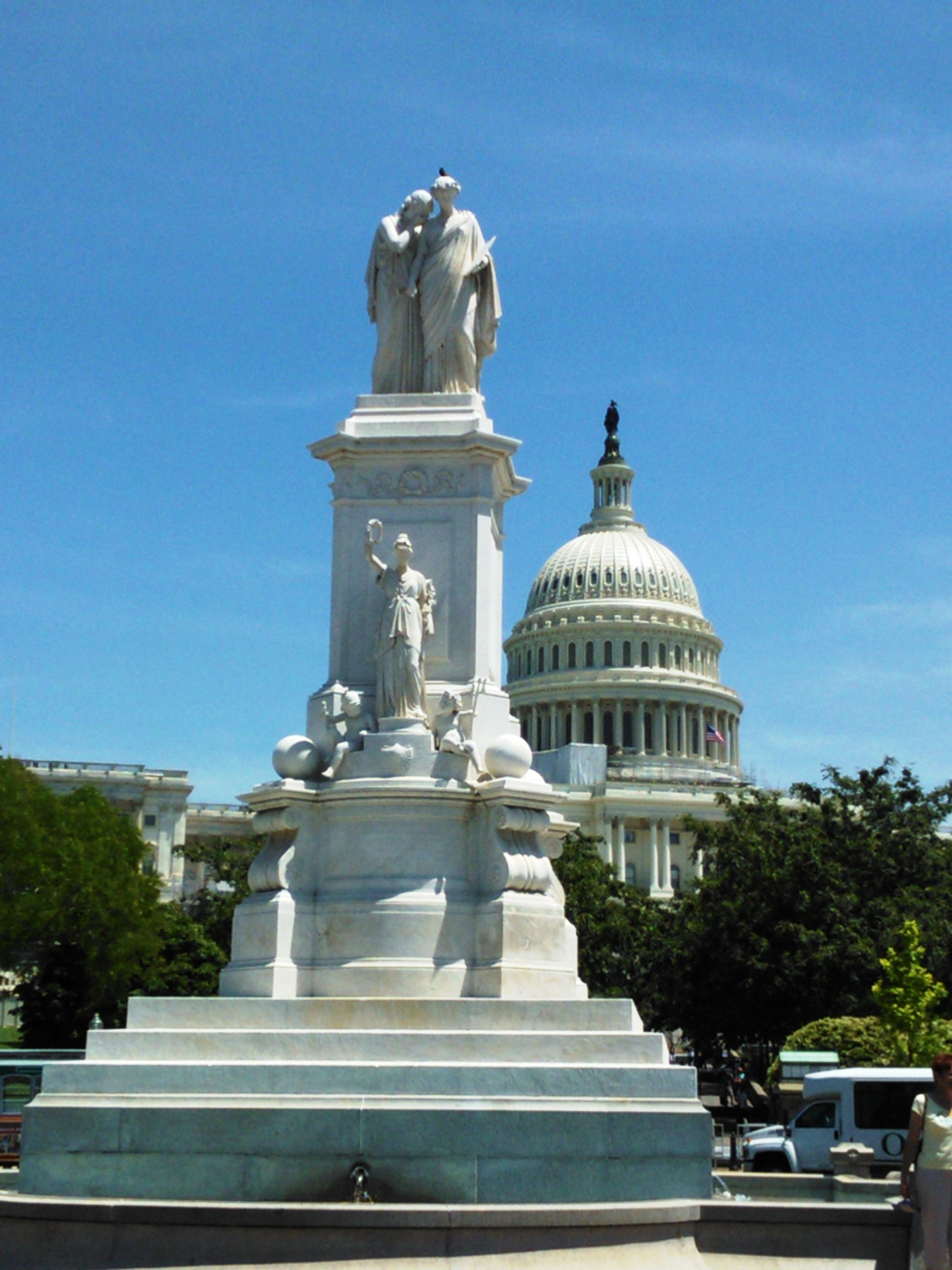
Peace Monument (marble, 1877), United States Capitol, Washington, D.C.

- Peace Monument (formerly Naval Monument) (marble, 1877), United States Capitol Grounds, Washington, D.C., Edward Clark, architect. The figures atop the monument are titled "Grief and History."
- Roger Williams (marble, 1872), National Statuary Hall Collection (representing Rhode Island).
- Governor William King (marble, 1878), National Statuary Hall Collection (representing Maine).
- Bust of Vice President Hannibal Hamlin (marble, 1889), United States Senate Vice Presidential Bust Collection.
- Bust of Vice President Adlai E. Stevenson (marble, 1894), United States Senate Vice Presidential Bust Collection.
- Ulysses S. Grant (marble, 1899), United States Capitol Rotunda. Simmons's original 1894 statue was rejected for the U.S. Capitol. It is now in the Portland Museum of Art.
- Bust of Vice President Charles W. Fairbanks (marble, 1905), United States Senate Vice Presidential Bust Collection.
- Francis Harrison Pierpont (marble, 1910), National Statuary Hall Collection (representing West Virginia).

== Gallery ==
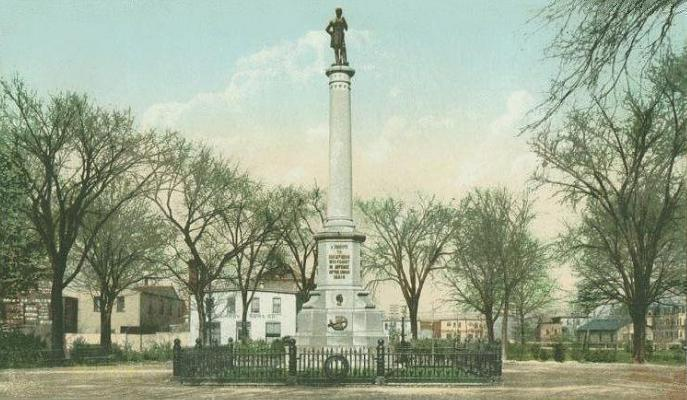
Soldiers and Sailors Monument (1867–69), Chelsea, Massachusetts

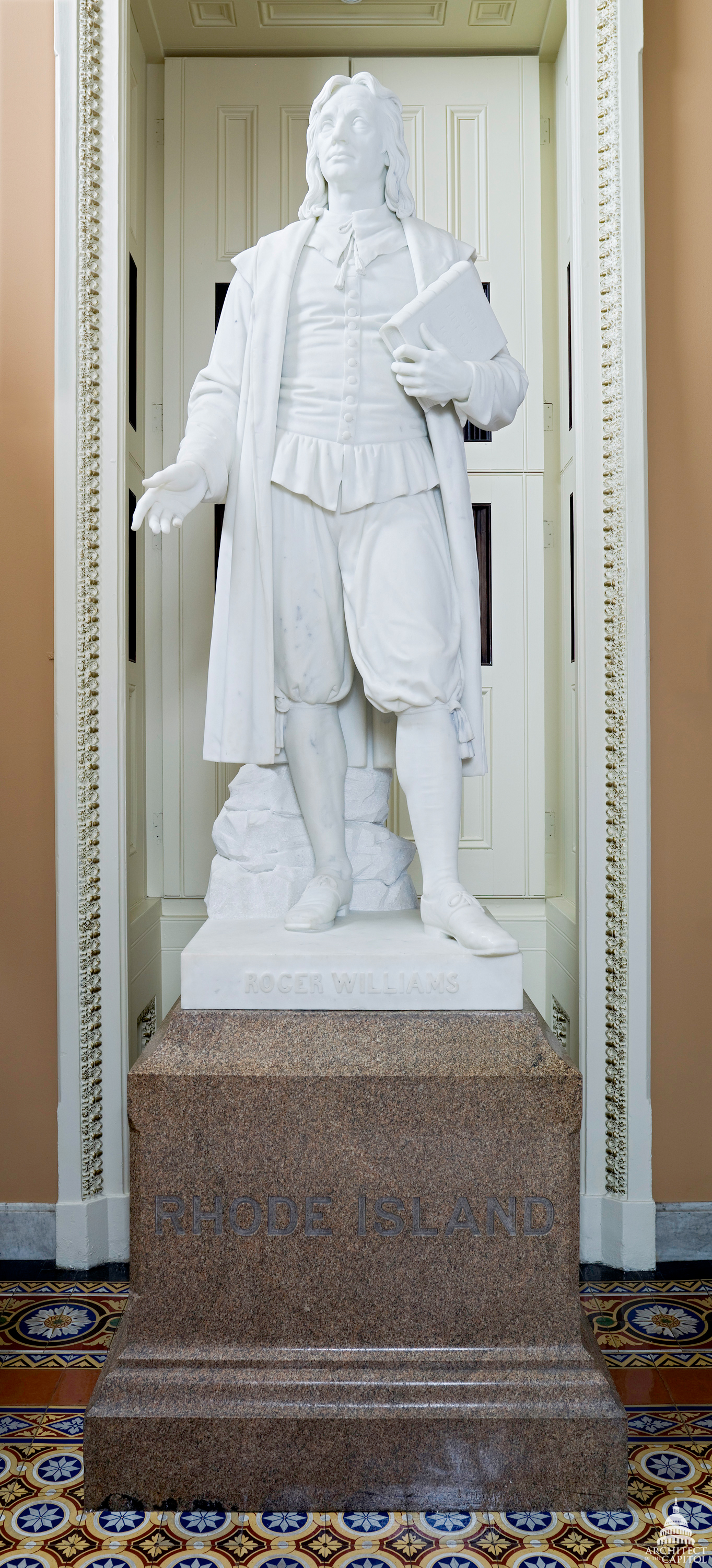
Roger Williams (1872), United States Capitol, Washington, D.C.

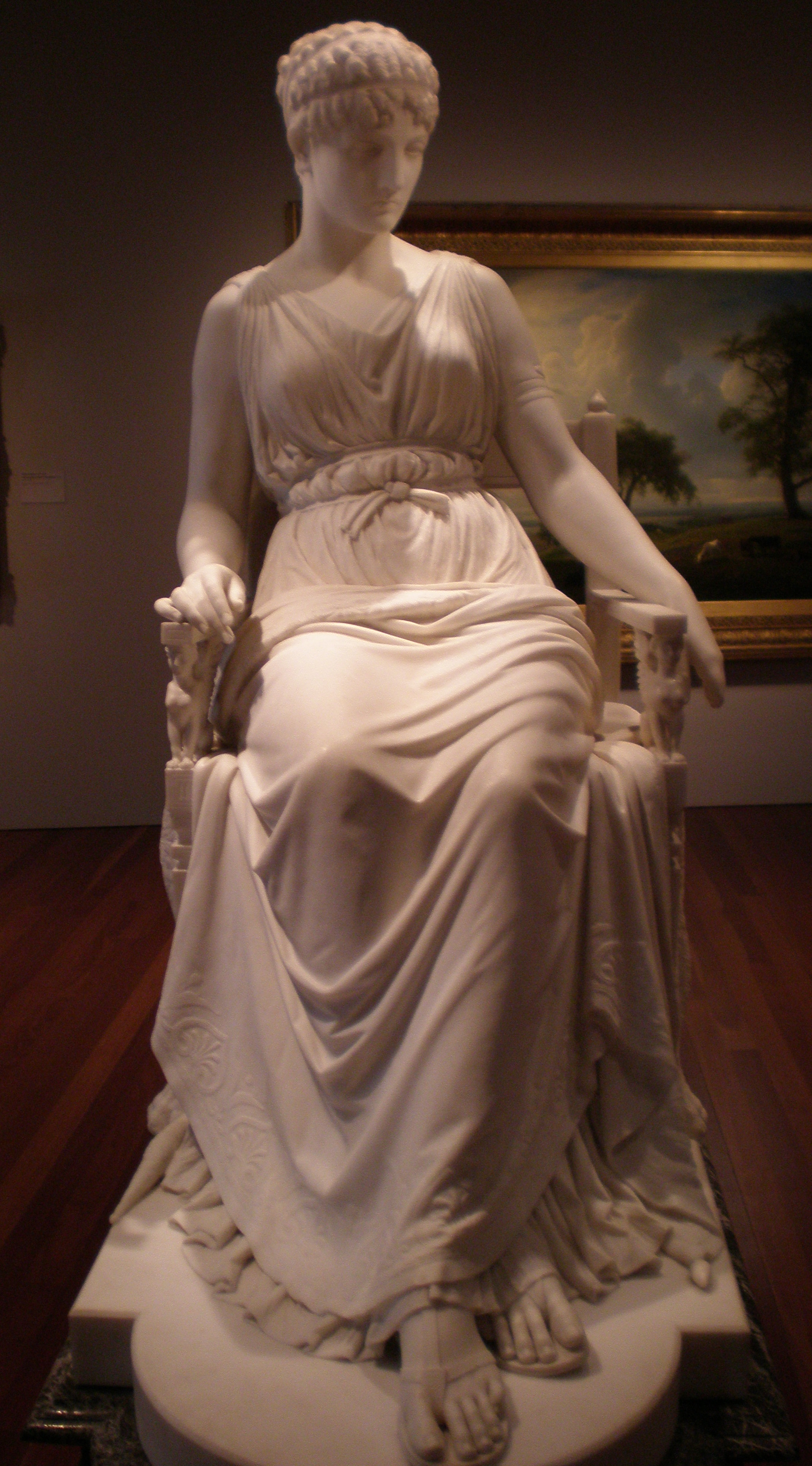
Penelope (1873), De Young Museum, San Francisco, California

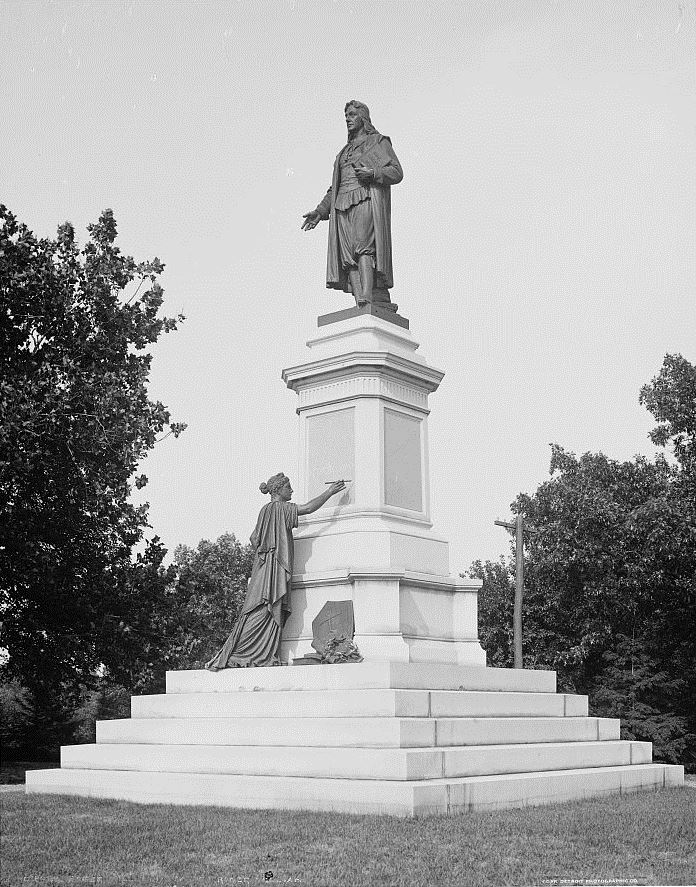
Roger Williams Monument (1874–77), Providence, Rhode Island

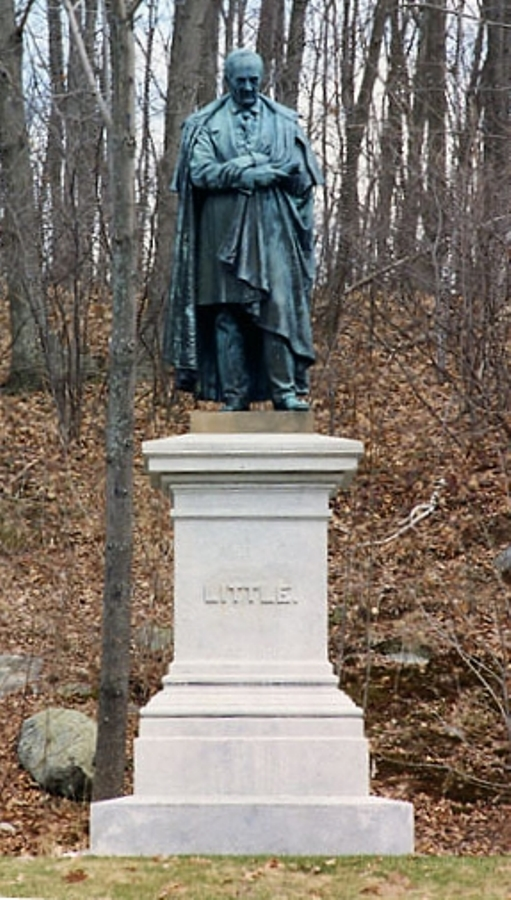
Edward Little Memorial (1875–77), Auburn, Maine

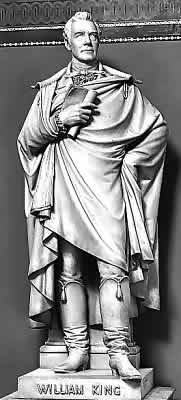
Governor William King (1878), United States Capitol, Washington, D.C.

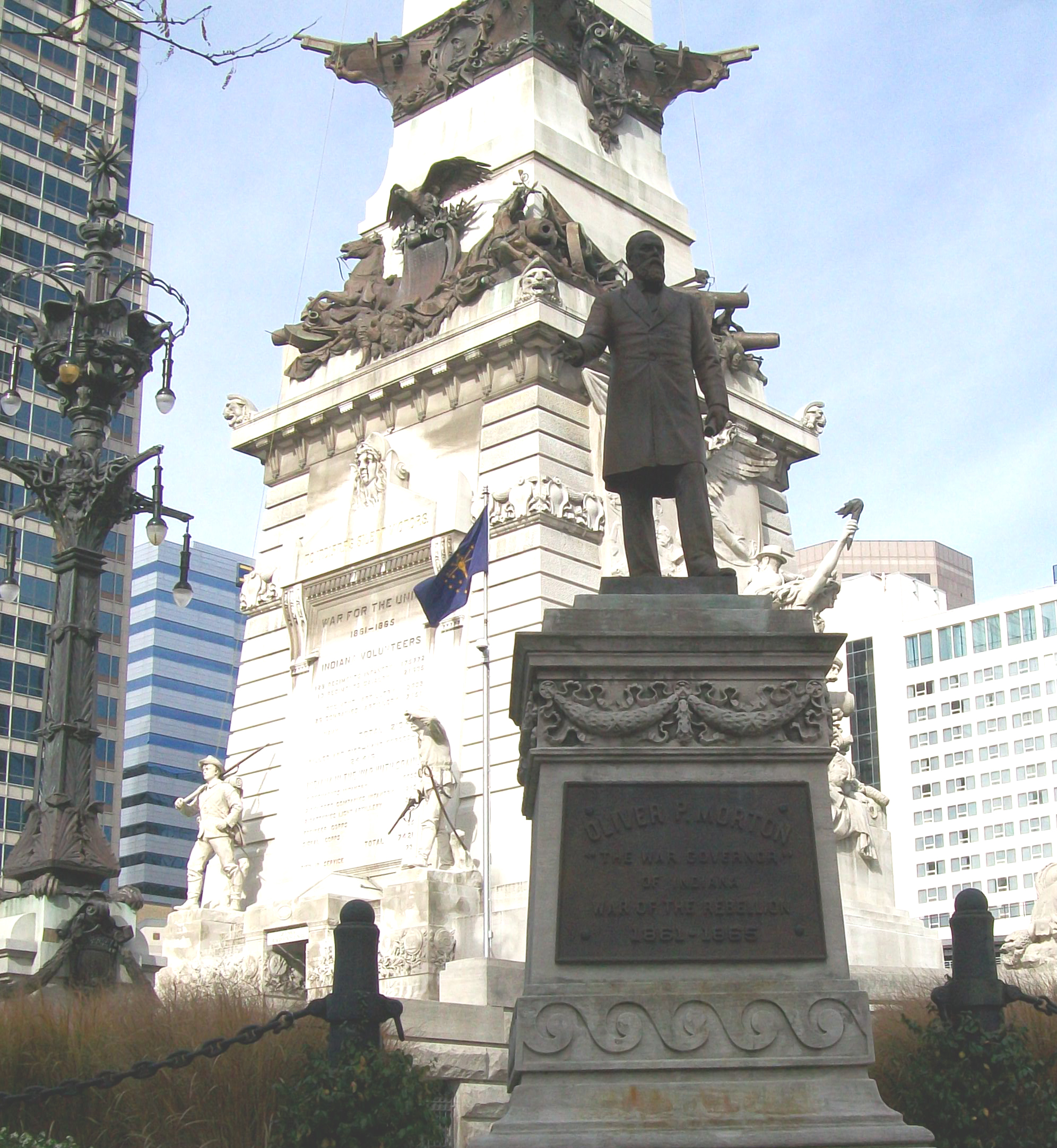
Senator Oliver P. Morton (1884), Indianapolis, Indiana

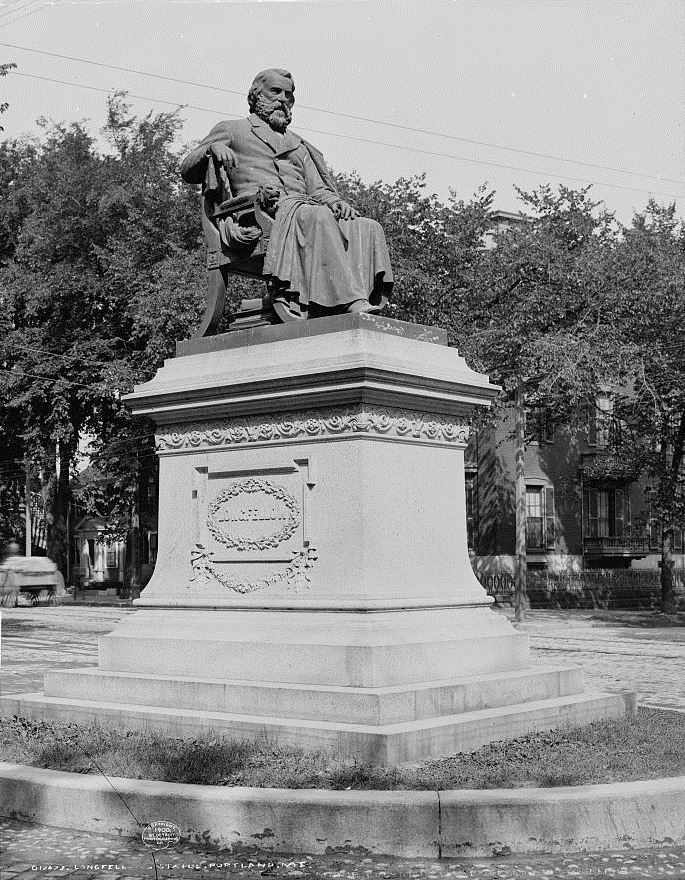
Henry Wadsworth Longfellow (1887), Portland, Maine

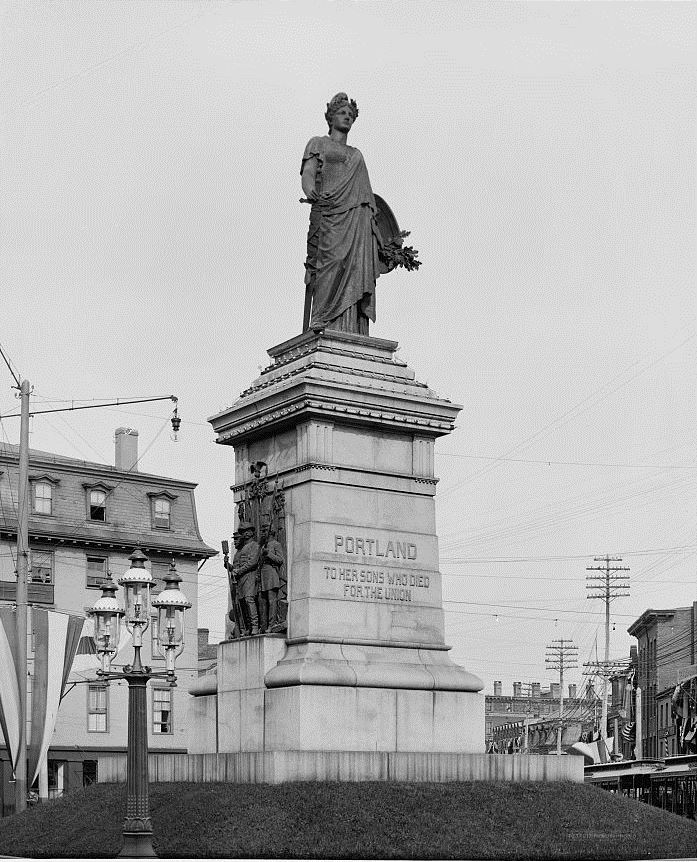
Soldiers' Monument (1888–91), Portland, Maine

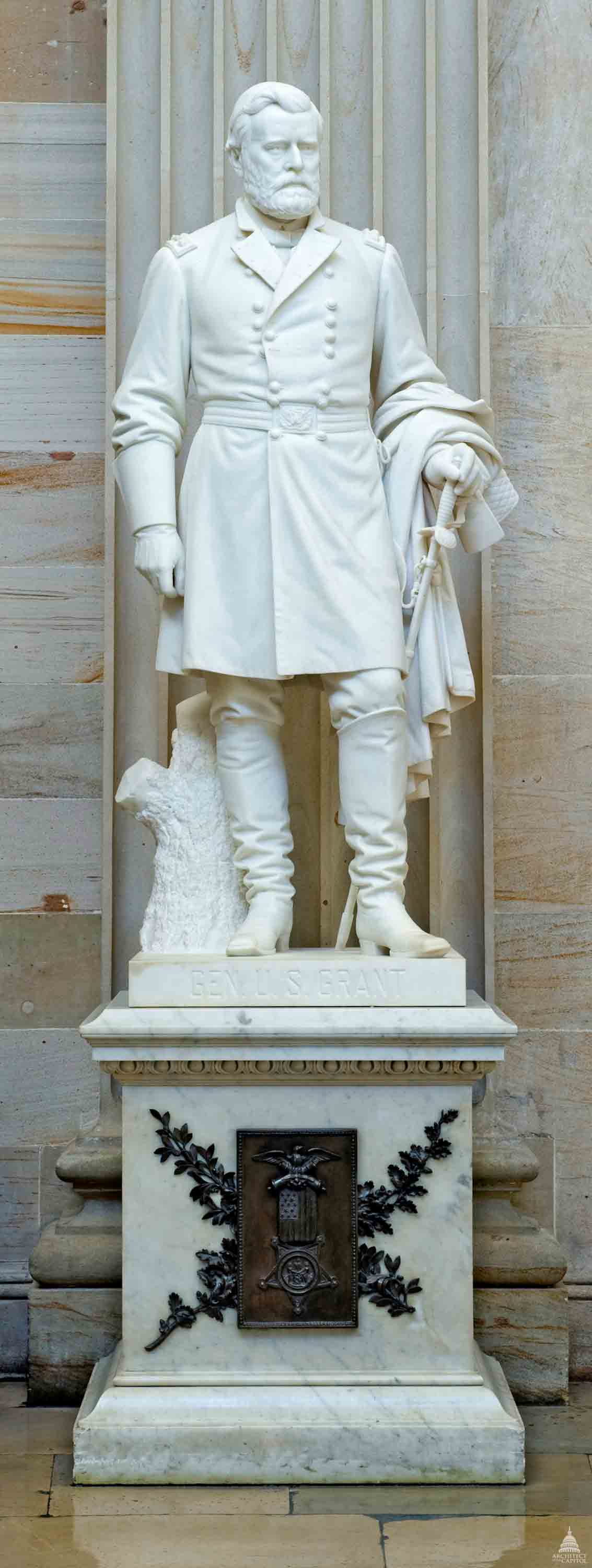
Ulysses S. Grant (1899), United States Capitol, Washington, D.C.

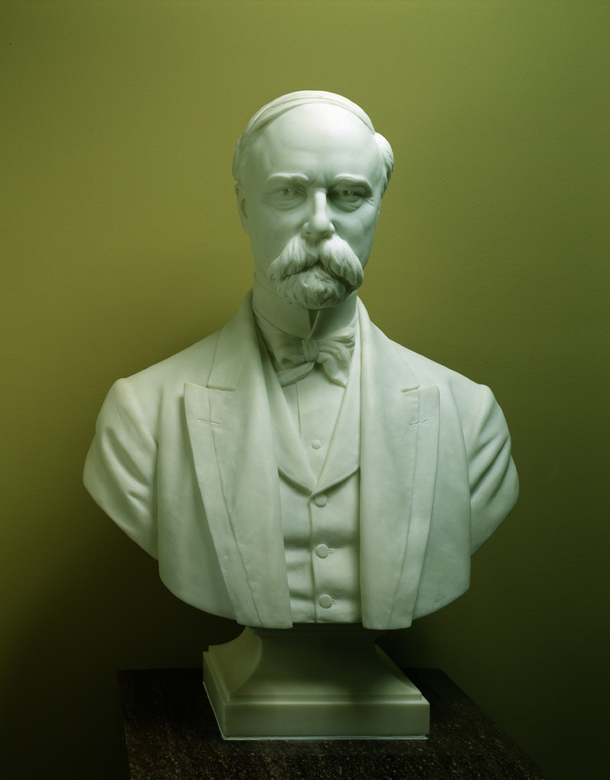
Vice President Charles W. Fairbanks (1905), United States Capitol, Washington, D.C.

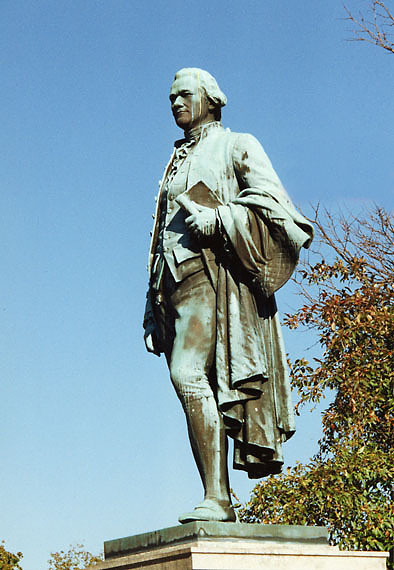
Alexander Hamilton (1905–06), Paterson, New Jersey

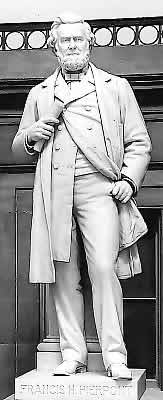
Governor Francis Harrison Pierpont (1910), United States Capitol, Washington, D.C.

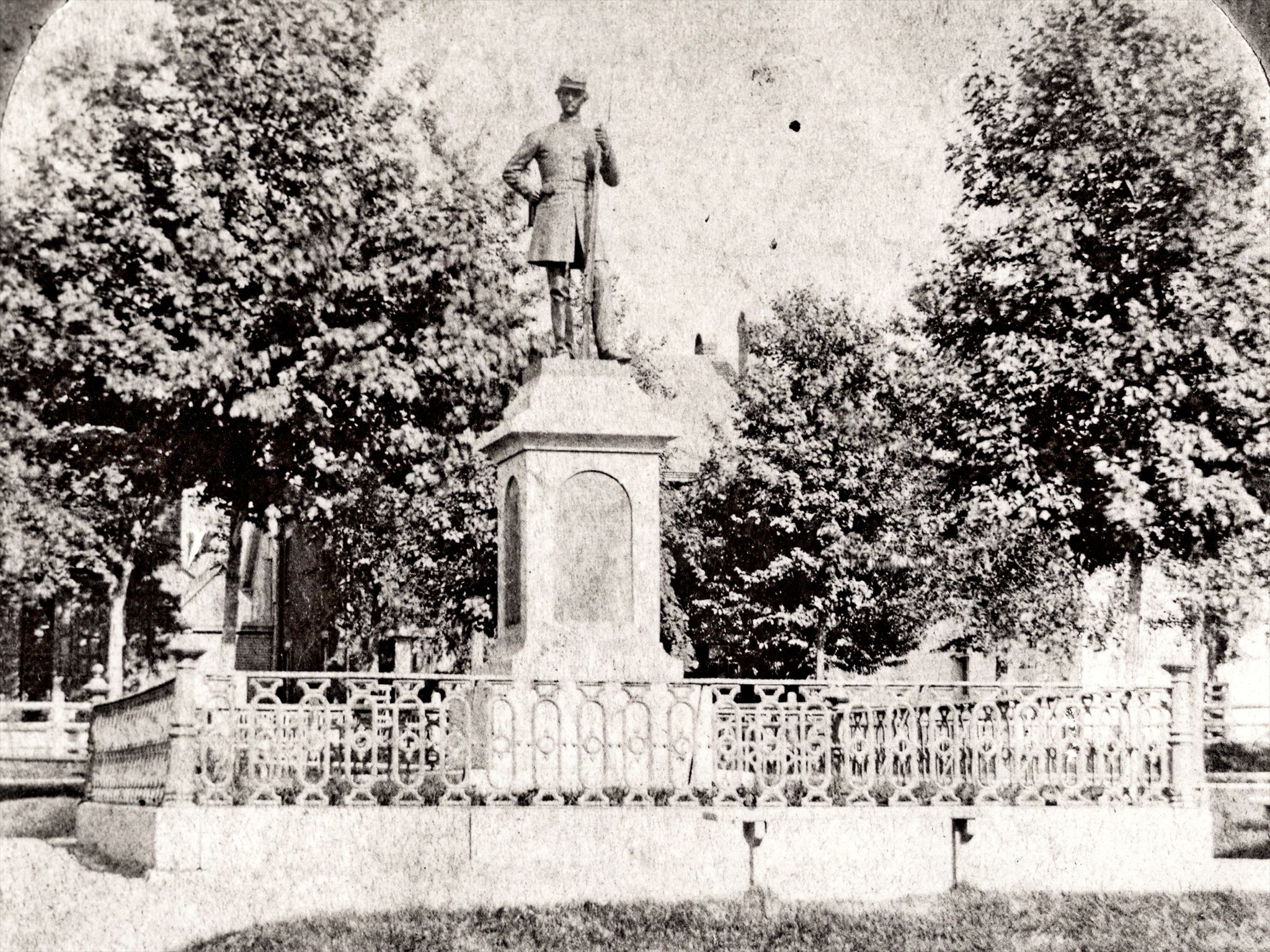
Civil War Memorial in Lewiston, Maine
