= Equestrian statue of John A. Logan =

Equestrian statue in Washington, D.C.

Major General John A. Logan
- Statue in 2010
- Interactive map of Major General John A. Logan
- Location: Logan Circle, Washington, D.C., United States
- Coordinates: 38.909644°N 77.029647°W
- Equestrian statue of John A. Logan
- U.S. National Register of Historic Places
- U.S. Historic district – Contributing property
- Part of: Civil War Monuments in Washington, D.C.
- NRHP reference No.: 78000257
- Added to NRHP: September 20, 1978
- Designer: Franklin Simmons (sculptor); Richard Morris Hunt (architect); Fonderia Nelli (founder); Cranford Paving Company (contractor)
- Material: bronze (sculpture) bronze and granite (base)
- Length: 10 feet (3.0 m)
- Width: 4.05 feet (1.23 m)
- Height: 12 feet (3.7 m)
- Opening date: April 9, 1901
- Dedicated to: John A. Logan

Major General John A. Logan, also known as the General John A. Logan Monument and Logan Circle Monument, is an equestrian statue in Washington, D.C., that honors politician and Civil War general John A. Logan. The monument is sited in the center of Logan Circle, a traffic circle and public park in the Logan Circle neighborhood. The statue was sculpted by artist Franklin Simmons, whose other prominent works include the Peace Monument and statues in the National Statuary Hall Collection. The architect of the statue base was Richard Morris Hunt, designer of prominent buildings including the Metropolitan Museum of Art in New York City and The Breakers in Newport, Rhode Island. Prominent attendees at the dedication ceremony in 1901 included President William McKinley, members of his cabinet, Senator Chauncey Depew, Senator Shelby Moore Cullom, and General Grenville M. Dodge.

The sculpture is one of eighteen Civil War monuments in Washington, D.C., which were collectively listed on the National Register of Historic Places in 1978. The bronze sculpture rests on a bronze and granite base adorned with two reliefs depicting historically inaccurate moments in Logan's life. The monument and surrounding park are owned and maintained by the National Park Service, a federal agency of the Interior Department.

== History ==
=== Background ===
John A. Logan (1826–1886) was a native of Illinois who served as a second lieutenant in the Mexican–American War before studying at the University of Louisville to become a lawyer. Originally a member of the Democratic Party, he was elected state senator and later a member of the U.S. House of Representatives. During the onset of the Civil War, Logan denounced what he considered extremists on both sides, but eventually volunteered to fight with the Union Army during the First Battle of Bull Run. He then resigned from Congress and was made colonel after he organized the 31st Illinois Volunteer Infantry Regiment. Logan was wounded twice while serving in the war and considered an outstanding field commander. He was promoted to brigadier general following the victory at Fort Donelson. Logan played a significant role in the Union success at Vicksburg and served as that district's military governor. Following the death of General James B. McPherson, Logan was given command of the Army of the Tennessee, but was soon relieved by General Oliver O. Howard after Logan became too involved with the 1864 presidential election. He left the army in 1865 and resumed his career in politics.

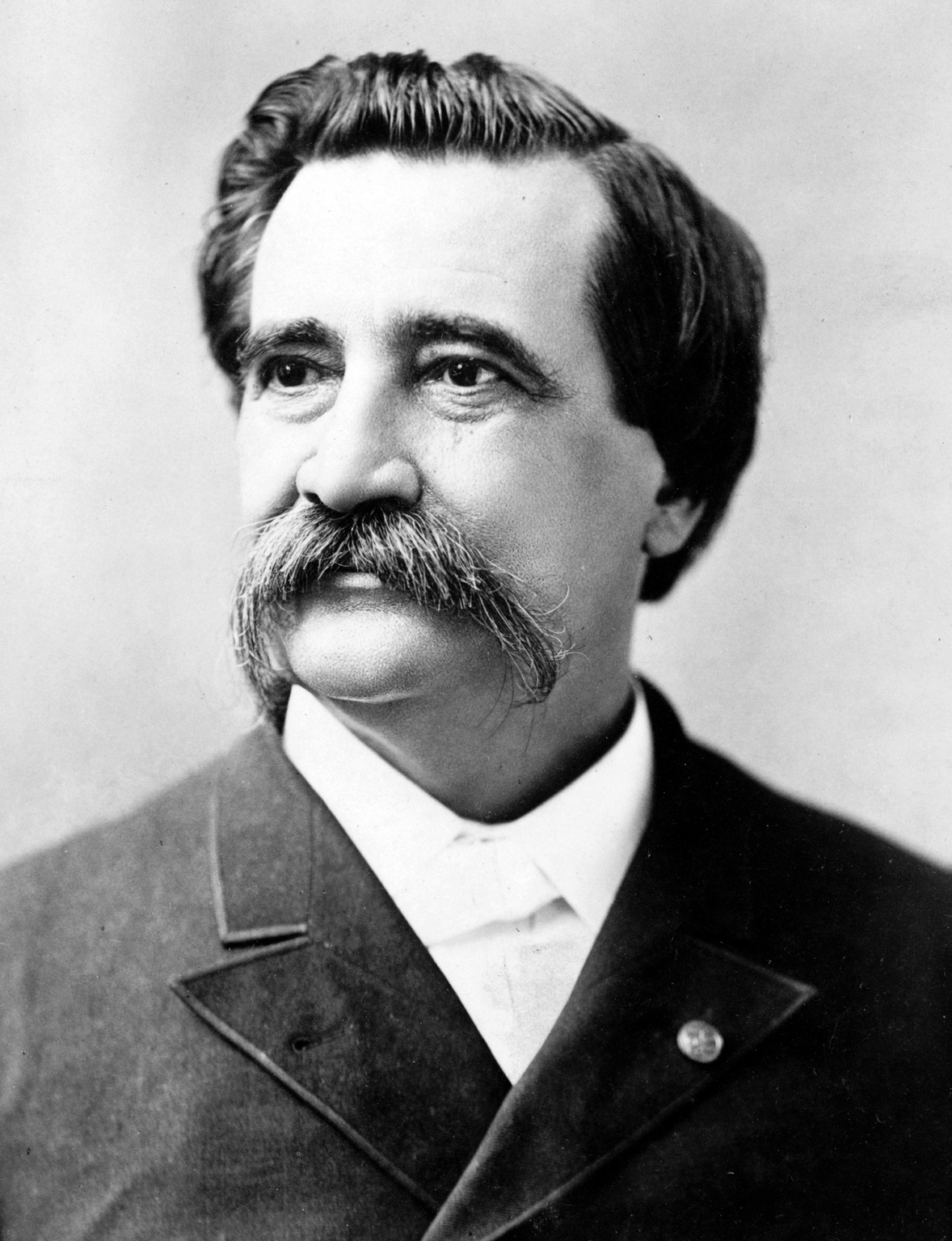
John A. Logan

Logan was elected as a Republican to the U.S. House of Representatives and later to the U.S. Senate. In the 1884 presidential election, Logan unsuccessfully ran with Senator James G. Blaine as his vice presidential candidate, narrowly losing the race. During his time in office, Logan was considered one of the most vocal advocates for military veterans. He helped organize two veteran fraternal organizations, the Grand Army of the Republic (GAR) and the Society of the Army of the Tennessee (SAT), and was instrumental in the federal government recognizing Memorial Day (originally called Decoration Day) as an official holiday, first celebrated in 1868.

Soon after Logan's death in 1886, the SAT began work on erecting a monument to the military hero. The organization worked closely with the GAR and Logan's widow, Mary, to raise funds and lobby Congress for a monument. It would be the second equestrian monument in Washington, D.C., commissioned by the SAT, the first being the Major General James B. McPherson statue. Erection of the monument was approved by an act of Congress on March 2, 1889. A memorial commission was created to select a sculptor and site for the statue. Members of the commission asked sculptor Augustus Saint-Gaudens who he would recommend. He suggested Franklin Simmons (1839–1913), an American artist working in Rome. Simmons had previously sculpted several Civil War monuments, including the Peace Monument in Washington, D.C. His other works in the city include several statues in the National Statuary Hall Collection and the United States Senate Vice Presidential Bust Collection.

The commission considered models by several sculptors before selecting Simmons in December 1892, whose model was the "most agreeable to Mrs. Logan." She admired not only the posture of Simmon's model, but his idea to have the statue rest on a bronze base, unlike other monuments in the city that featured granite bases. Mary also liked that Simmons and members of the commission would follow her recommendations for the reliefs to be found on the statue base. Simmons was paid $65,000 for his work; around $13,000 from the SAT and the remainder from the federal government. Sculpting the piece proved more difficult than Simmons had expected since the Logan statue was his first and only equestrian work. He was forced to ask for several extensions beginning in 1896. Simmons paid founder Fonderia Nelli extra money to work around the clock on the base, designed by prominent architect Richard Morris Hunt, whose other works include the Metropolitan Museum of Art in New York City and The Breakers in Newport Rhode Island.

It only took Nelli three-and-a-half months to complete the process instead of the planned year. The Cranford Paving Company was contracted to prepare the site and lay the granite foundation. Simmons was not pleased with the company's work and new stone was ordered in September 1897. Following the new stone's placement, the base was installed on April 18, 1898. It wasn't until 1900 that Simmons completed the sculpture and it was cast in Rome. Upon its completion, a ceremony attended by King Umberto I of Italy and his wife, Queen Margherita, was held at the foundry where Simmons was honored with knighthood. The sculpture was shipped to the United States and arrived in Brooklyn in December 1900. Because the sculpture was too large to be transported by train, it was placed onto a two-masted schooner and arrived in Washington, D.C., on January 16, 1901. It was installed on top of the base one week later.

The site chosen for the monument was the center of Iowa Circle, a park in an upscale neighborhood in the city's northwest quadrant. The park was completely redesigned in 1891 to make room for the monument. By the time it was dedicated in 1901, nearby Dupont Circle was lined with mansions and had become more popular with the city's wealthy residents while Iowa Circle, surrounded by stately row houses, had become a middle-class neighborhood.

=== Dedication ===
The monument was formally dedicated on April 9, 1901. Temporary platforms for invited and distinguished guests were built near the base. Guests included President William McKinley, members of his cabinet, Senator Chauncey Depew, Senator Shelby Moore Cullom, General Grenville M. Dodge, Mary Logan and several members of the Logan family, representatives from the GAR and SAT, and Simmons. Prior to the ceremony, there was a large military parade led by Colonel Francis L. Guenther. The parade consisted of soldiers, marines, seamen from the nearby Navy Yard, the District of Columbia militia, and GAR and SAT veterans. Dodge, who was president of the SAT and the only living general depicted on one of the relief panels, presided over the ceremonies. George Tucker, a grandson of Logan, pulled a cord, parting the flags that had draped over the statue. This was followed by cheers and applause from the crowd while the Fourth Artillery fired a national salute.

McKinley, the last Civil War veteran to occupy the White House, gave an address which included the following remarks: "It is a good token when patriots are honored and patriotism exalted. Monuments which express the nation's gratitude for great deeds inspire great deeds. The statue unveiled today proclaims our country's appreciation of one of her heroic sons whose name is dear to the American people, the ideal volunteer soldier of two wars, the eminent senator and commoner, General John A. Logan." Following the president's speech, Depew also gave an address. His remarks included: "The history of our country is condensed in the Revolutionary and civil wars. As Washington stands out in the first of our crucial contests, so does Lincoln in the second. About Lincoln cluster Grant, Sherman, Sheridan, Logan, McPherson, and a host of other heroes...Among those successful Americans in many lines who have won and held the public eye and died mourned by all their countrymen, there will live in the future in the history of the Republic no nobler figure, in peace and in war, in the pursuits of the citizen, and in work for the welfare of his fellow citizens, than General John A. Logan." Cullom then read a letter from Illinois governor Richard Yates Jr., who was unable to attend, which paid tribute to Logan and noted how proud the state's citizens were of the Illinois native. The ceremony concluded following the benediction by Reverence J. G. Butler.

=== Reception ===
The historically inaccurate relief panel depicting Logan being sworn into the Senate by Vice President Chester A. Arthur.

Initial reception to the statue was very positive. The New York Times described it as producing "an impression of dignity, beauty, and power." But in the weeks following the dedication ceremony, praise turned to criticism and reporters noted "absurdities" in the relief panels. They noted that the relief depicting Logan gathered with other Civil War leaders plotting strategy together was very unlikely. The second panel, depicting Logan being sworn in as senator by Vice President Chester A. Arthur was called "impossible" and "ridiculous." Logan was sworn into the Senate in 1879 and Arthur himself was not sworn in as vice president until 1881. Two of the senators depicted in that relief were not sworn in until 1882 and 1884, respectively, and another one died in 1877. Mary Logan initially took credit for selecting the scenes depicted in the reliefs and received all of the blame when the errors were discovered. In a heated letter to the Evening Star, she said the reliefs were not meant to be historically accurate: "Of course, we knew all this, but we disregarded it because we wanted these panels to portray the most prominent men of the history of the country who were in the Senate during the 16 years that my husband was Senator." She added to reproduce historically accurate scenes would have been "absurd."

=== Later history ===
In 1930, Congress renamed Iowa Circle in honor of Logan, who had briefly lived at 4 Logan Circle in 1885. The statue is one of eighteen Civil War monuments in Washington, D.C., that were collectively listed on the National Register of Historic Places (NRHP) on September 20, 1978, and the District of Columbia Inventory of Historic Sites on March 3, 1979. It is also designated a contributing property to the Logan Circle Historic District, listed on the NRHP on June 30, 1972, and the Fourteenth Street Historic District, listed on the NRHP on November 9, 1994. The monument and surrounding park are owned and maintained by the National Park Service, a federal agency of the Interior Department.

== Design and location ==
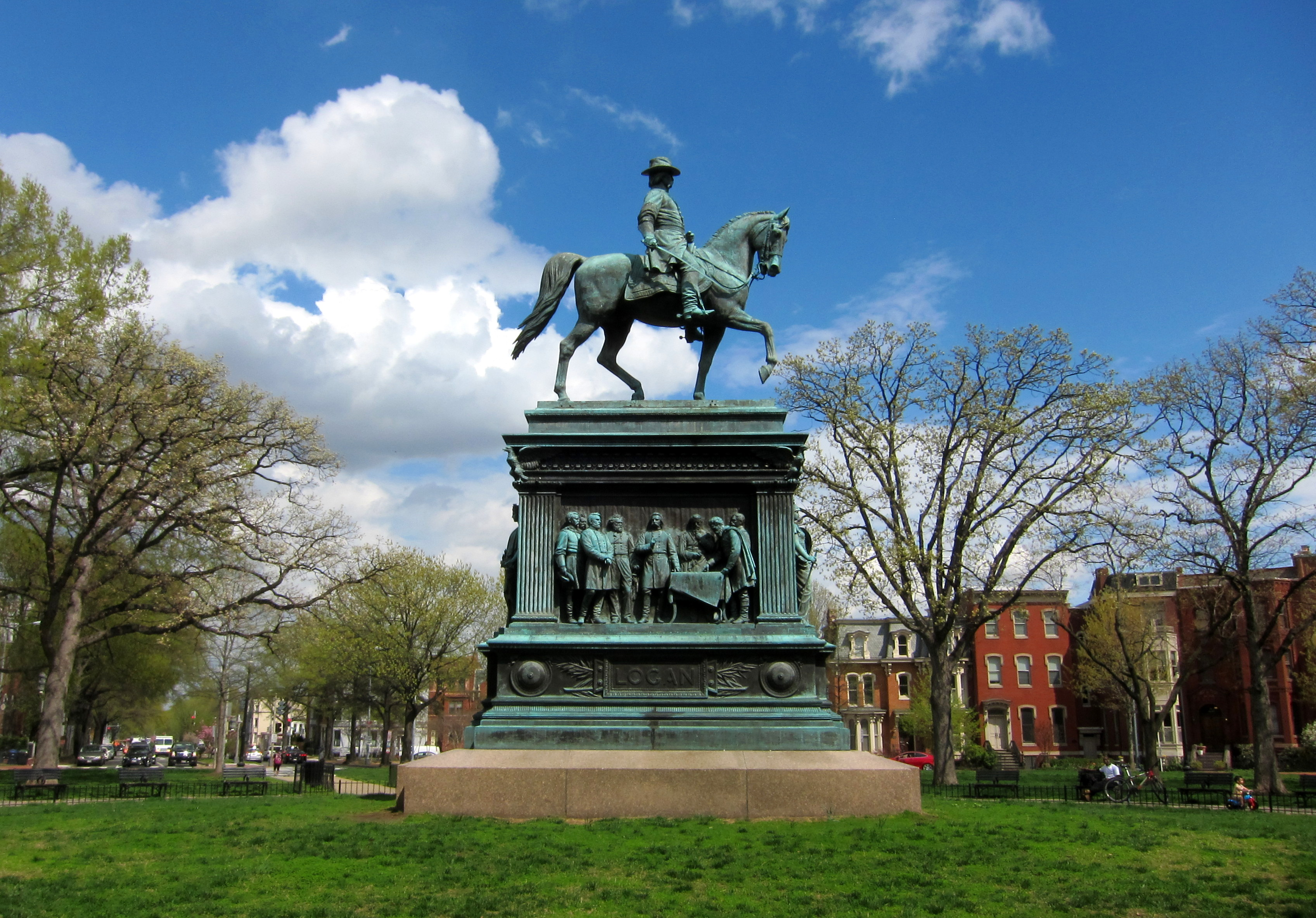
The west face of the monument

The monument is sited in the center of Logan Circle, a 1.8 acre (0.73 ha) public park and traffic circle in the Logan Circle neighborhood at the convergence of 13th Street, P Street, Rhode Island Avenue and Vermont Avenue NW. Sidewalks lead from the edge of the circle to the monument on axis with the surrounding streets. Around twenty oak trees are planted throughout the circle and a small, ornamental iron fence surrounds the statue base.

The bronze equestrian statue measures 12 ft (3.7 m) tall, 10 ft (3.0 m) long, and 4.05 ft (1.23 m) wide. It weighs approximately 11,000 lb (5,000 kg). Logan is depicted with collar-length hair and a moustache, wearing his Civil War military uniform; a long belted jacket, boots, gloves, and a hat. He holds the horse's reins with his left hand and his right hand holds his sword, pointed downward. The horse is striding forward, with its right foot raised. The inscriptions "FOND. NELLI ROMA 1897" and "FRANKLIN SIMMONS" are found on the statue.

The statue rests on a rectangular bronze base which is itself on top of a low granite base. The base is 30 ft (9.1 m) high, 22 ft (6.7 m) long, and 3 ft (0.91 m) wide. It weighs approximately 35,000 lb (16,000 kg). A bald eagle symbolizing Patriotism adorns the upper section of each corner of the bronze base. Around the inscription "LOGAN" are palm leaves symbolizing Victory. These are located on the east and west sides of the lower portion of the bronze base. The relief on the west side of the base depicts Logan surrounded by fellow officers discussing the Civil War. The officers include Generals Francis Preston Blair Jr., Dodge, William Babcock Hazen, Mortimer Dormer Leggett, Joseph A. Mower, and Henry Warner Slocum, and Captain Bill Strong. On Logan's proper right is a map spread on a table with three of the officers studying it. The remaining officers are looking towards Logan who has his left hand resting on the map. The relief on the east side of the base depicts Logan being sworn into office as a senator by Vice President Arthur. Logan's right arm is raised while Arthur's left hand is raised and holding a book. Other senators depicted in the relief include Roscoe Conkling, Cullom, William M. Evarts, John F. Miller, Oliver P. Morton, Allen G. Thurman, and Daniel W. Voorhees. A female allegorical figure is on the north and south sides of the base. The figure on the north side, representing Peace or Victory, is holding a laurel wreath in her right hand and a fasces in her left hand. She is wearing long robes and has a laurel wreath on her head. The figure on the south side, representing War, is holding a shield with her left hand and a sword with her right hand. She is wearing a dress adorned with armor details and a crown-shaped helmet.

== See also ==
- List of equestrian statues in the United States
- List of public art in Washington, D.C., Ward 2
- Outdoor sculpture in Washington, D.C.
