= Gov. William King House =

Historic house in Maine, United States

- U.S. National Register of Historic Places
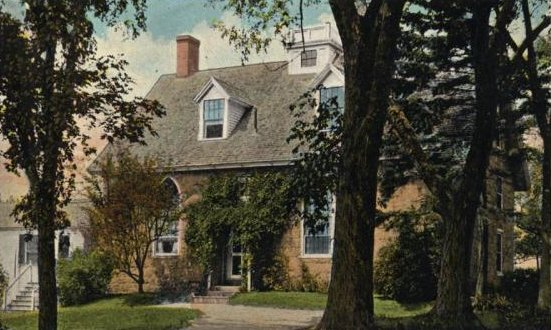
- c. 1920 postcard view

- Location within Maine Location within the United States
- Location: Whiskeag Rd., Bath, Maine
- Coordinates: 43°55′58″N 69°49′25″W
- Area: 1 acre (0.40 ha)
- Built: 1812
- Architectural style: Gothic Revival
- NRHP reference No.: 76000112
- Added to NRHP: May 24, 1976

The Governor William King House, also known locally as the Stone House, is a historic house on Whiskeag Road in Bath, Maine. Built in 1812, this stone house's lancet-arch windows are one of the first examples of Gothic Revival architecture in New England. The house was built as a summer retreat for William King, who led the drive for Maine statehood, and served as the state's first governor. The house was listed on the National Register of Historic Places in 1976.

== Description and history ==
The King House is located in a rural area of northern Bath, on the south side of Whiskeag Road. It is a 2 1/2-story stone structure, built out of dressed granite blocks and covered by a gabled roof. The main facade faces to the east, and is three bays wide, with a central entrance flanked by tall sash windows with multipane lancet-arch sections rising to the eaves. The roof is topped by a square cupola. The interior of the building retains well-preserved but restrained Federal period woodwork.

William King (1768-1852) was one of Bath's leading businessmen and merchants of the early 19th century. He was a leader of the Massachusetts militia (Maine then being a part of that state) during the War of 1812. He was an instrumental figure in promoting Maine's statehood, and in the drafting of its constitution, and was elected its first governor in 1820. He acquired a large tract of land in this area in 1809–13, on which he planted an orchard. He had this house built about 1812 as a summer retreat; his principal residence was more centrally located in Bath.

== See also ==
- National Register of Historic Places listings in Sagadahoc County, Maine
