= Peace Monument =

Monument at the United States Capitol

- U.S. Historic district – Contributing property
- D.C. Inventory of Historic Sites
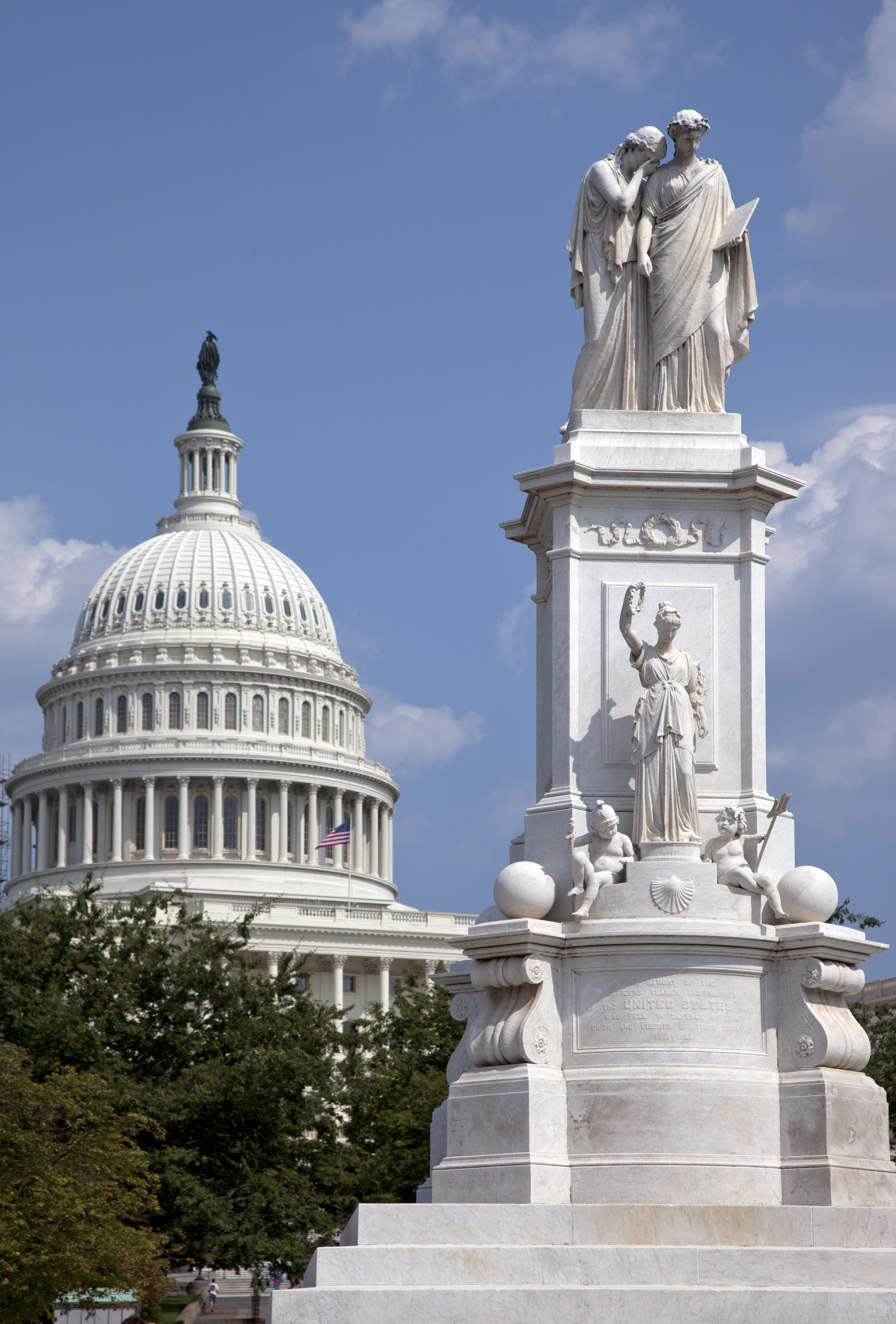
- West face of the monument with the U.S. Capitol in the background
- Location: 1st Street and Pennsylvania Avenue NW Washington, D.C., U.S.
- Coordinates: 38°53′26.28″N 77°0′44.39″W
- Built: 1878
- Architect: Franklin Simmons (sculptor); Edward Clark (architect); David Dixon Porter (designer)
- Part of: • National Mall Historic District (66000031) • Pennsylvania Avenue National Historic Site (66000865) • Civil War Monuments in Washington, D.C. (78000257) • L'Enfant Plan (97000332)

Significant dates
- Designated CP: • October 15, 1966 (National Mall Historic District) • October 15, 1966 (Pennsylvania Avenue National Historic Site) • September 20, 1978 (Civil War Monuments in Washington, D.C.) • April 24, 1997 (L'Enfant Plan)
- Designated DCIHS: • November 8, 1964 (National Mall Historic District) • January 19, 1971 (L'Enfant Plan) • June 19, 1973 (Pennsylvania Avenue National Historic Site) • March 3, 1979 (Civil War Monuments in Washington, D.C.)

The Peace Monument, also known as the Navy Monument, Naval Monument or Navy-Peace Monument, stands on the western edge of the United States Capitol Complex in Washington, D.C. It is in the middle of Peace Circle, where First Street and Pennsylvania Avenue NW intersect. The surrounding area is Union Square, which the monument shares with the Ulysses S. Grant Memorial, James A. Garfield Monument, and the Capitol Reflecting Pool. The front of the monument faces west towards the National Mall while the east side faces the United States Capitol.

The idea of a monument honoring men who fought in the Union Navy during the Civil War was spearheaded by Admiral David Dixon Porter, who wanted the monument to stand in Annapolis, Maryland, where his father, Commodore David Porter, had assisted in the installation of the Tripoli Monument. Due to an uneasy relationship between the younger Porter and Secretary of the Navy Gideon Welles, the monument was not installed in Annapolis. Porter lobbied Congress and an additional $20,000 was allocated to build the base. This was in addition to the $9,000 Porter raised amongst naval personnel and private citizens. Porter chose Franklin Simmons to sculpt the monument's statues, one of many works in Washington, D.C., by Simmons. Architect of the Capitol Edward Clark designed the base. Pieces of the monument began to arrive in 1876, and the final piece arrived in January 1878. Unlike most of the city's war monuments, there was no formal dedication ceremony.

The monument is made of Carrara marble, which has led to numerous restorations, since that type of marble is not meant to be outside in the elements. The monument is 44 feet (13 m) high and is 10 feet (3.0 m) long on each side. There were additional pieces that were to be installed, including decorative lampposts and water features, but either due to funding or Welles' intervention, the monument remained unfinished. The monument has become a gathering place during protests and rallies, leading to further deterioration of the marble. People protesting against the Vietnam War, the Three Mile Island accident, and the murder of George Floyd, have gathered at the monument. It was also a site where rioters gathered before the January 6 United States Capitol attack.

The Peace Monument is a contributing property to four listings on the National Register of Historic Places and the District of Columbia Inventory of Historic Sites: the National Mall Historic District, the Pennsylvania Avenue National Historic Site, the collective listing of Civil War Monuments in Washington, D.C., and the L'Enfant Plan. Ownership of the monument was transferred in 1973 to the Architect of the Capitol, which has performed several cleaning and restoration projects since that time.

== History ==
=== Memorial plans and installation ===
After the Civil War, there were plans to erect a significant number of memorials in Washington, D.C., honoring men who served in the Union Army. Admiral David Dixon Porter wanted to also honor Union Navy sailors amongst the memorials. Porter had started planning for a memorial in 1864 after Union forces captured Fort Fisher. His father, Commodore David Porter, had also led a movement to honor United States Navy sailors who fought in the Barbary Wars. His father's memorial, the Tripoli Monument, was originally placed in the Washington Navy Yard, but it was moved to Annapolis, Maryland, in 1860. Porter Jr. was selected to lead the United States Naval Academy after the war. It was there, in 1865, that he began making serious plans for the Civil War monument.

Porter raised money for his project via naval personnel and private citizens. By 1871, he had raised $9,000, and sketched what the monument should look like. No competition to design the monument was held, as Porter directly selected Franklin Simmons to sculpt the work. Simmons was known for making portrait sculptures and by 1868 had moved to Rome to work on a statue of Roger Williams for the United States Capitol, which would be the first of several he produced for the National Statuary Hall Collection. Porter had probably seen Simmons' works since the latter had moved to Washington, D.C., in the 1860s, producing a series of 24 medallions depicting figures from the executive branch and military of the Union starting in 1864. Simmons had also already designed a Civil War monument located in Lewiston, Maine. Porter gave Simmons his sketch for the monument, and insisted it be made of Carrara marble. After fundraising was complete, Simmons began carving the commission at his art studio in Rome. Gideon Welles, Secretary of the Navy, was angry that he was not consulted on the matter. The two men had a tumultuous relationship; Porter knew Welles would have rejected the idea.

After Porter lobbied members of Congress in 1872, the federal government approved the monument and allocated $20,000 for the base. Porter wanted the monument to be placed in Annapolis, where his father's monument was located, but Welles said no. The Congress found a better location for the monument, near the U.S. Capitol complex. An Act of Congress passed on July 31, 1876, allowing for the monument to be erected on the proposed site. The following year, Simmons began shipping pieces of the monument to Washington, D.C., on a boat named Supply. Architect of the Capitol Edward Clark designed the granite base and most pieces of the monument were installed in 1877. The statue of Peace was added to the monument in January 1878.

Unlike many other Civil War memorials erected at the time, the Naval Monument (later renamed the Peace Monument by the press), did not receive an elaborate dedication with a parade and speeches from prominent individuals. This may be in part to the bad blood between Porter and Welles, or the fact the monument was not actually finished. Decorative lampposts and elaborate water features were never completed, possibly due to lack of funding. One writer mentioned the parts that were never installed: "Cascades flow from the mouths of bronze dolphins in the sub-base, and four artistic lamp posts stand at the rim of the basin."

=== Later history ===
The monument is a contributing property to four listings on the National Register of Historic Places (NRHP) and the District of Columbia Inventory of Historic Sites (DCIHS). The National Mall Historic District was listed on the DCIHS on November 8, 1964, and the NRHP on October 15, 1966. The Pennsylvania Avenue National Historic Site was listed on the NRHP on October 15, 1966, and the DCIHS on June 19, 1973. The monument is one of eighteen sculptures, fountains, and other memorials related to the Civil War, which were collectively listed on the NRHP on September 20, 1978, and the DCIHS on March 3, 1979. The fourth and final listing is the L'Enfant Plan, listed on the DCIHS on January 19, 1971, and the NRHP on April 24, 1997.

During the 1970s, people scaled the monument during protests against the Vietnam War and the aftermath of the Three Mile Island accident. In 1973, ownership of the monument transferred to the Architect of the Capitol as part of the United States Capitol grounds. By that time the monument was in serious need of repairs and cleaning. There were pieces missing, as well as lichen and grime on the monument. The marble type used to build the monument is not accustomed to being outdoors, exposed to the elements. After many tests and observations, the monument was cleaned in 1991, a year after masonry and other parts were repaired. Fissures were filled, missing pieces replaced, and a stone consolidant was applied to everything that was marble. Additional cleaning took place in 1999 and 2010. In 1999, The Washington Post reporter DeNeen L. Brown noted the monument "was missing feet, arms and facial features, eaten away by wind and acid rain and damaged by frequent protesters."

The monument was vandalized by unknown assailants during the George Floyd protests with spray-painted messages like "BLM," "all pigs will die," and "capitalism must fall." The monument was power washed by Architect of the Capitol employees afterwards. Before the January 6 United States Capitol attack in 2021, members of the Proud Boys and other rioters gathered around the monument. It is also where flowers and flags were left after the death of United States Capitol Police officer Brian Sicknick, who died from two strokes after the attack. In 2022, art and architecture critic Philip Kennicott called for a national memorial to victims of gun violence in the United States. He said the best location would be at the foot of the Capitol, between the Peace Monument and James A. Garfield Monument.

== Location and design ==
The Peace Monument is located on Reservation 202A in Union Square, along with the Ulysses S. Grant Memorial, James A. Garfield Monument, and Capitol Reflecting Pool. The square is on the west side of the United States Capitol Complex, which borders the eastern edge of the National Mall. The Peace Monument is in the middle of Peace Circle where First Street and Pennsylvania Avenue NW intersect. The monument's name has several varieties, including the original Navy Monument, the Naval Monument, and Navy-Peace Monument.

The monument measures 44 feet (13 m) high and is 10 feet (3.0 m) long on each side. The entire monument is made of Carrara marble, which has required long-term maintenance since that type of marble is not intended for outdoor purposes. The sculptures at the top of the monument face west and depict America crying on the shoulder of History, both of whom are wearing classical robes. America is crying due to the lives lost during the Civil War. History has a stylus and a tablet which reads, "They died that their country might live."

On the west side of the monument's second tier is Victory holding an oak branch in her left hand. Neptune and Mars are depicted as small children holding weaponry. In addition to the branch, Victory is holding a laurel wreath with her right hand. Further down the base is the quatrefoil basin which is on all sides of the monument. The east side of the monument, facing the Capitol, features a topless statue of Peace. She is wearing a robe that she holds with her left arm and her right hand is holding an olive branch. There are two cherubs at her feet. Also by her feet is a dove resting on wheat, symbolizing Agriculture and Plenty, and on the other side of her feet are Science, Literature, and Art emblems.

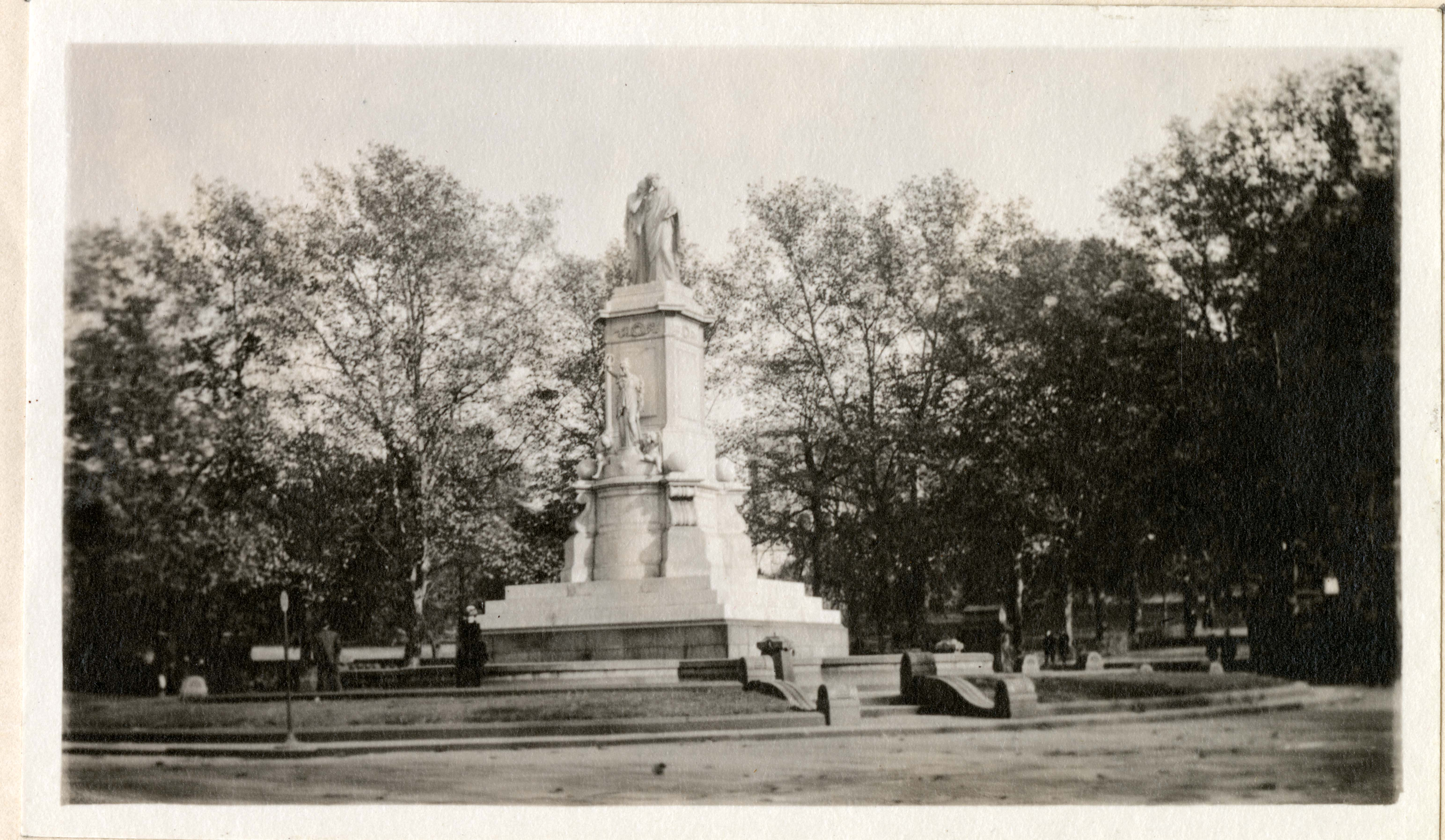
Peace Monument in 1919

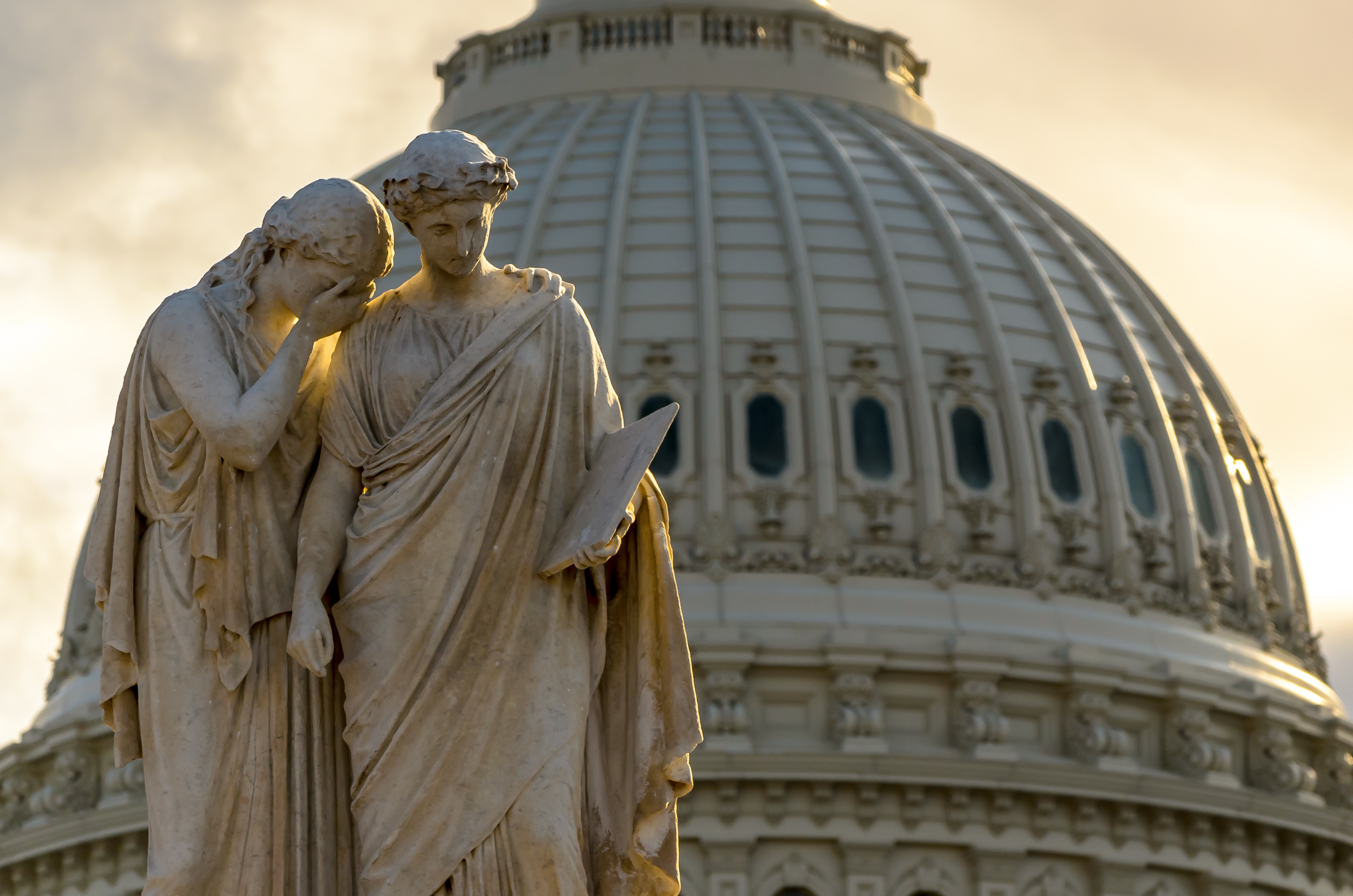
America and History at the top of the monument

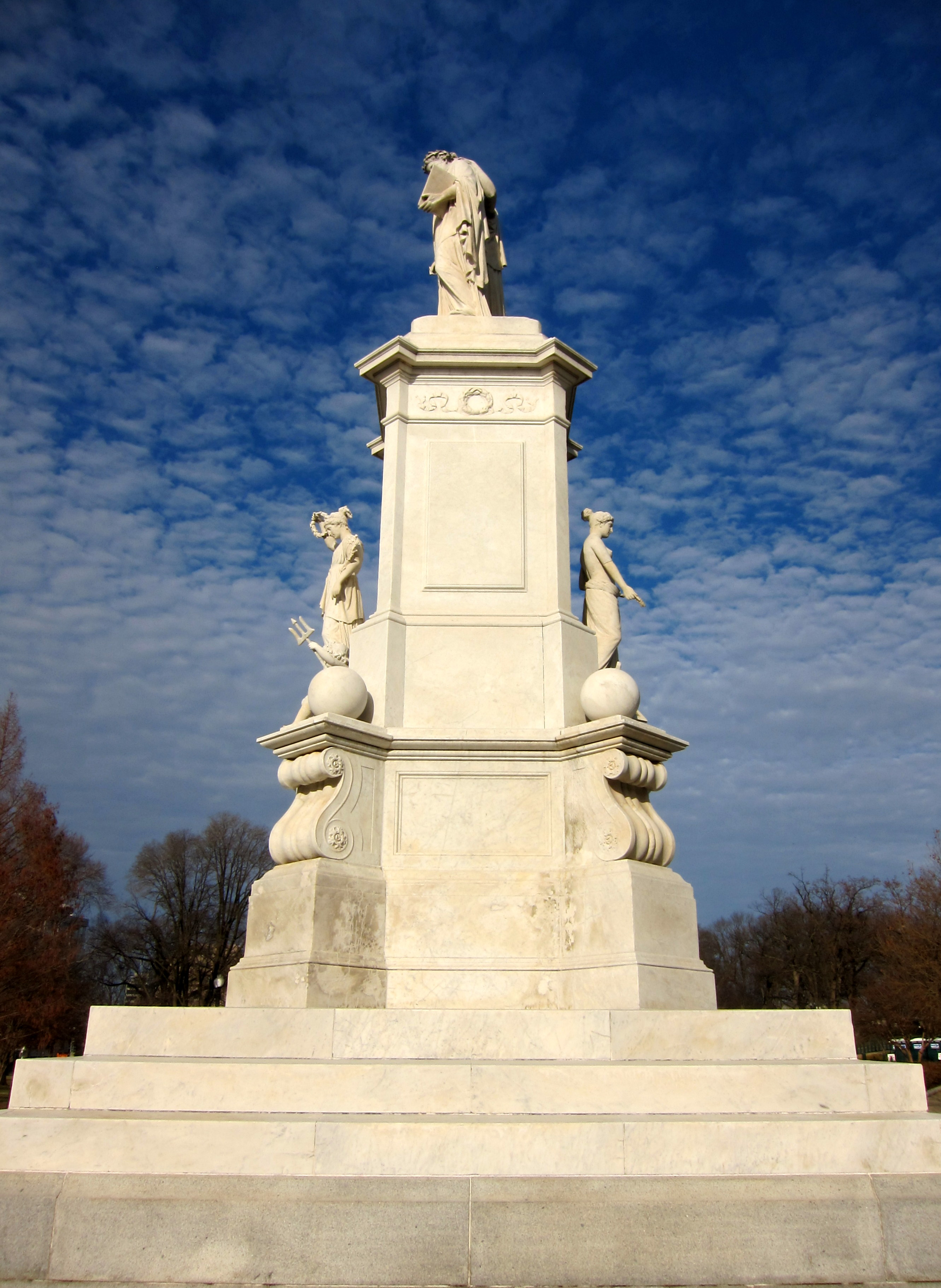
South side of the monument

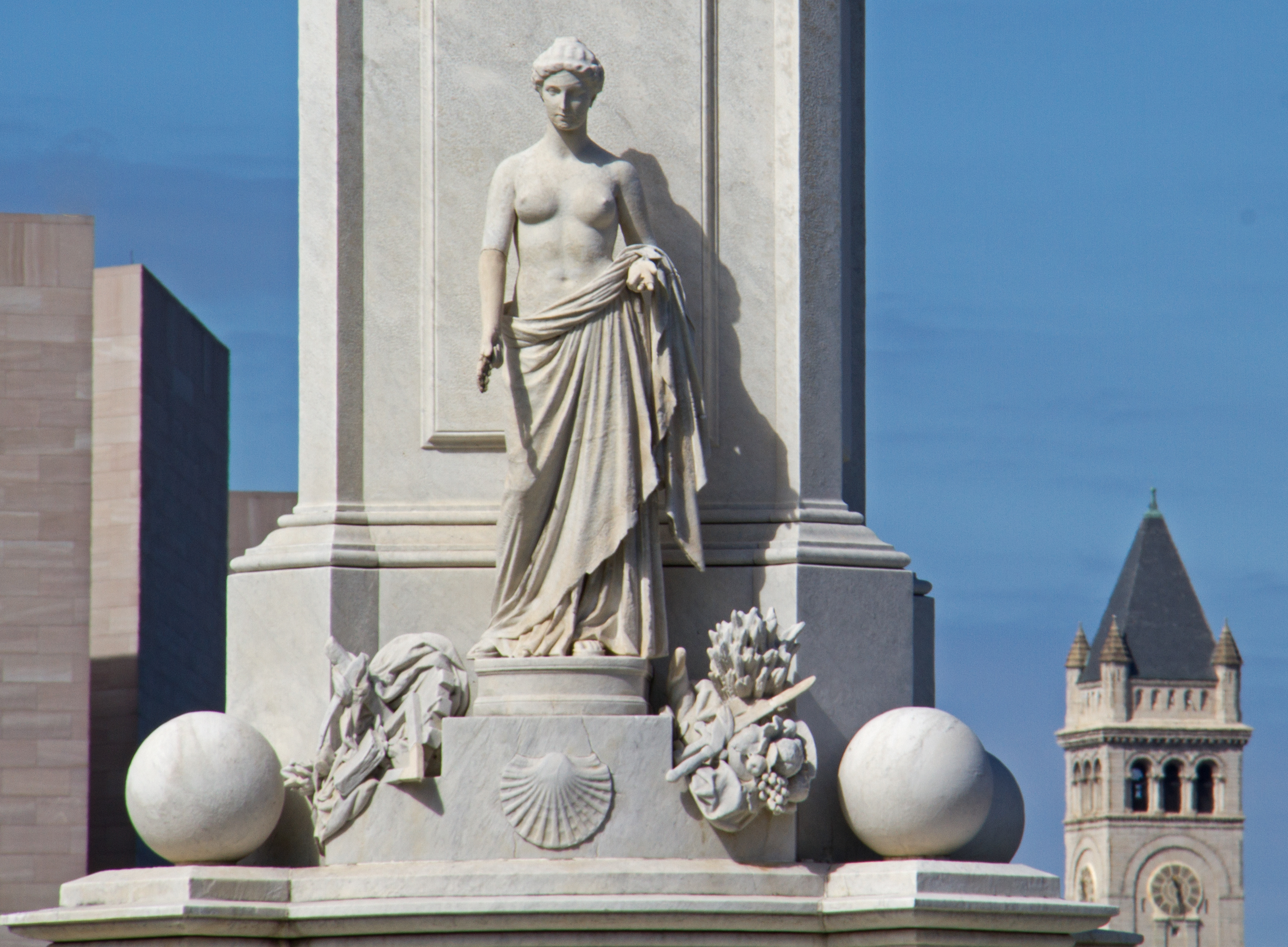
Peace on the east side of the monument

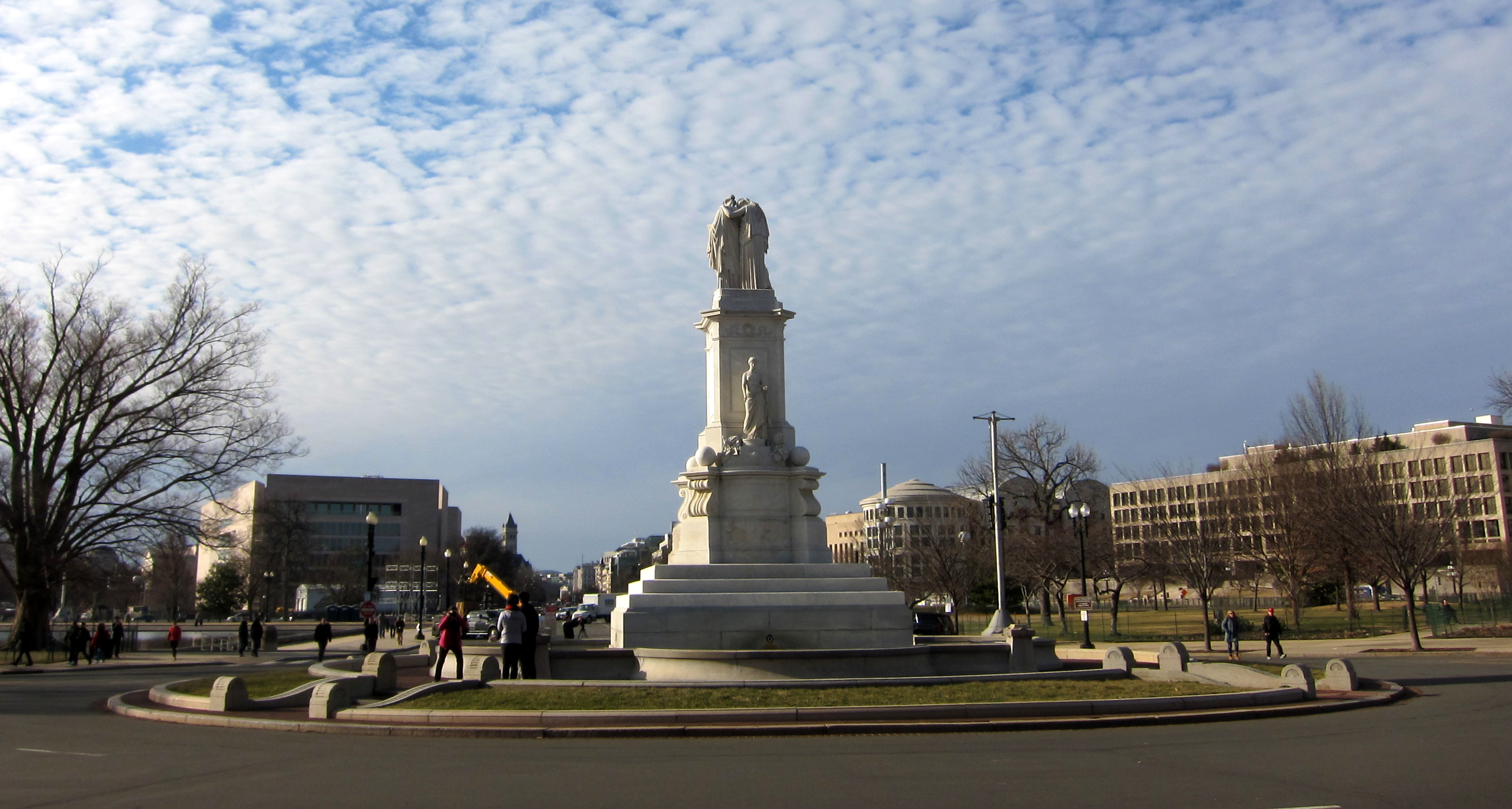
The traffic circle where the monument stands

== See also ==
- List of public art in Washington, D.C., Ward 6
- National Register of Historic Places listings in Washington, D.C.
- Navy – Merchant Marine Memorial
- Outdoor sculpture in Washington, D.C.
- United States Navy Memorial
