= Statue of Roger Williams (U.S. Capitol) =

Statue by Franklin Simmons

Roger Williams
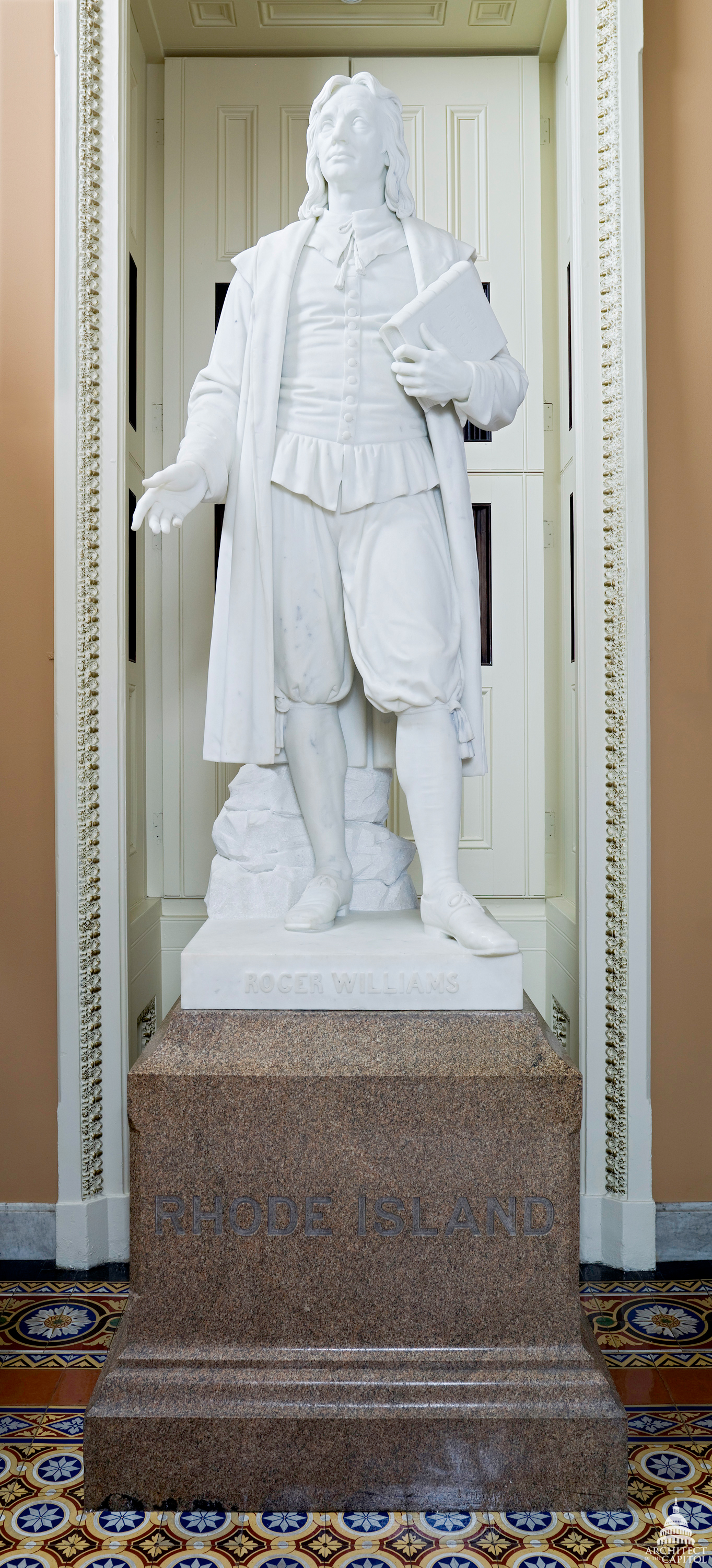
- Artist: Franklin Simmons
- Medium: Marble sculpture
- Subject: Roger Williams

Roger Williams is an 1872 marble sculpture of Roger Williams by Franklin Simmons, installed in the United States Capitol, in Washington, D.C., as part of the National Statuary Hall Collection. It is one of two statues donated by the state of Rhode Island. The sculpture was unveiled by Senator William Sprague of Rhode Island on January 9, 1872.

Simmons received the commission to execute the statue in 1868 and moved to Rome to produce the work. After setting up his studio there and working on the statue for two years Simmons decided to remain in Italy. Lorado Taft in his The History of American Sculpture describes the statue as "a credible work, which may well have ranked for years among the best in that collection".

The statue is one of three that Simmons has placed in the collection, the others being William King, from Maine and Francis Harrison Pierpont from West Virginia.

== See also ==
- 1872 in art
