= Statue of William King =

Statue in the U.S. Capitol

William King
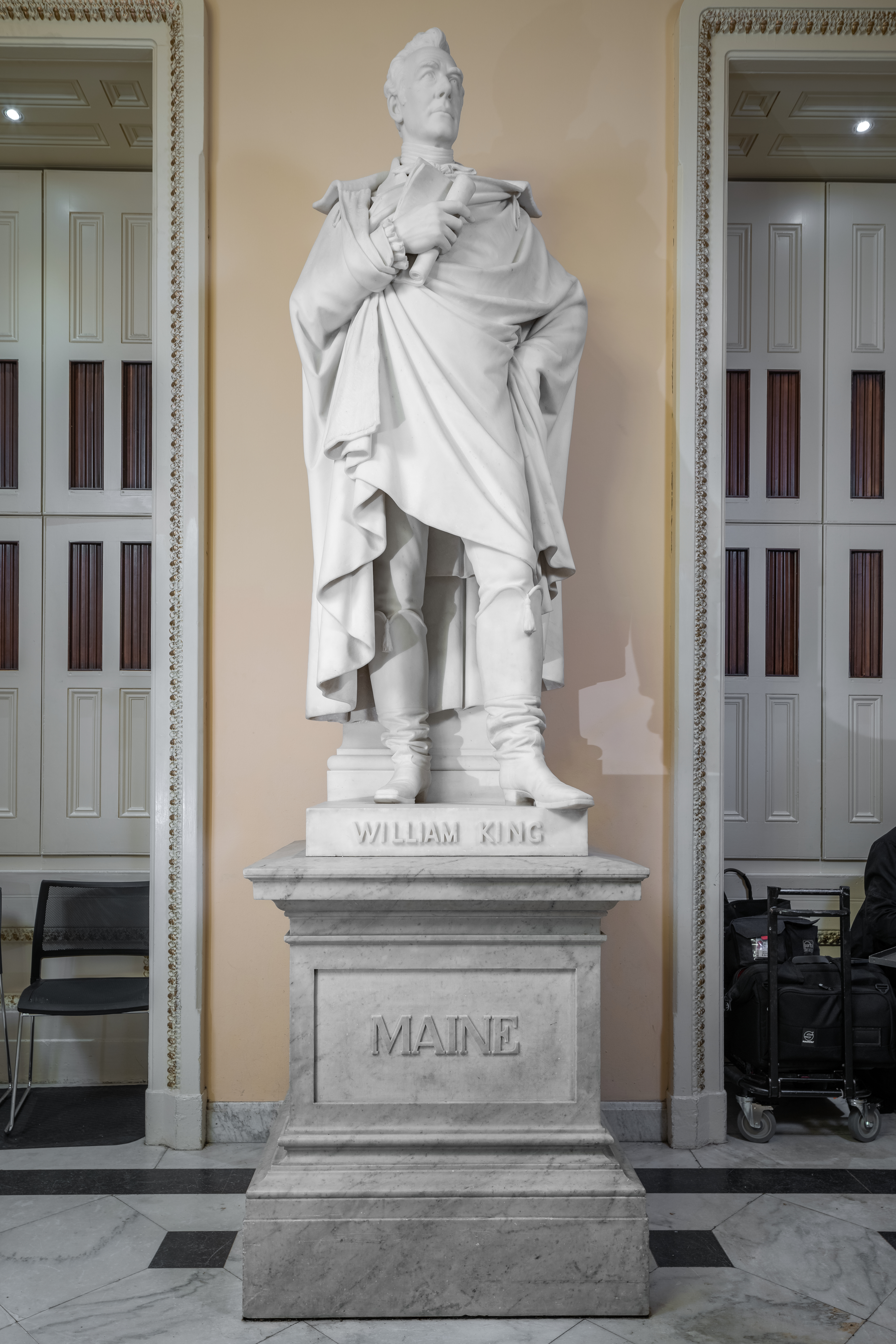
- The statue in 2023
- Artist: Franklin Simmons
- Year: 1878
- Medium: Marble sculpture
- Subject: William King
- Location: Washington, D.C., U.S.

William King is an 1878 marble sculpture of Maine's first governor of the same name by Franklin Simmons, installed in the United States Capitol, in Washington, D.C., as part of the National Statuary Hall Collection. It is one of two statues donated by the state of Maine.

The statue was accepted in the collection by Senator Hannibal Hamlin (who himself became the subject of Maine's second entry in the collection) and Senator James G. Blaine on January 22, 1878. Blaine rhapsodized upon the occasion, "He restrained the wrath of the impudent, quickened the zeal of the laggard, dissipated the fears of the doubting and molded his adherents and followers into a compact, cooperative, effective force ... He, more than any other man created the State of Maine".

The work is one of the few in the collection in an overtly neoclassical style, with King's cloak serving as much as a toga as anything else. Simmons, upon being commissioned to create the Roger Williams statue for Rhode Island, moved to Rome where both good marble and good assistants were cheaply found, then moved there permanently, so his statue of King would have been made there. Sculptor and critic Lorado Taft found the King statue "well poised" but "with little vivacity or charm of modeling". He then notes "the severe treatment of the drapery".

== See also ==
- 1878 in art
