= Alice May Douglas =

American writer

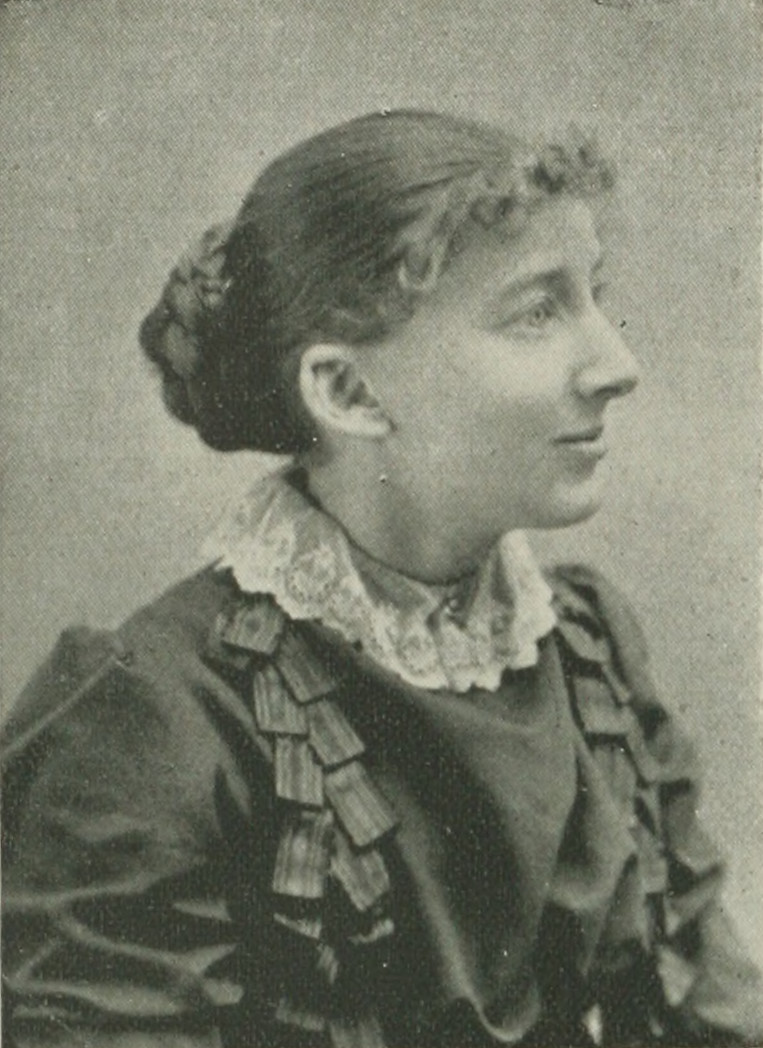
- Photo in A Woman of the Century
- Born: June 28, 1865; Bath, Maine, U.S.
- Died: January 6, 1943 (aged 77)
- Occupations: Author, editor
- Writing career
- Language: English
- Genres: poetry, juvenile literature, non-fiction

Alice May Douglas (June 28, 1865 – January 6, 1943) was an American author, newspaper editor, and peace activist from Bath, Maine. She began her writing career at the age of eleven. Inspired by the book Little Women, she became a constant contributor to the press. She was the editor of two monthly papers, the Pacific Banner and The Acorn, and wrote several volumes of poetry and juvenile books, many of which first appeared as serials. Douglas was a State superintendent for the Woman's Christian Temperance Union's (WCTU) peace and arbitration department and founded a peace band for children with international branches.

== Biography ==
Alice May Douglas was born in Bath, Maine, June 28, 1865, which remained her residence for the remainder of her life. She had no formal training in writing, saying instead that "All my poems and stories are the result of inspiration."

She began her career as an author at the age of eleven years, when her first published article appeared among the children's productions of St. Nicholas Magazine. The reading of Little Women at the age of thirteen marked an epoch in her life. She determined to be an author like Jo, and, like her, sent for publication a composition she wrote to test her chances of getting published. Consequently, she sent a poem pertaining to a little sister, who shortly before death was seen throwing kisses to God. The Zion's Herald, to which the poem was sent, published it, and from that time, Douglas was a constant contributor to the press.

Douglas was also engaged in editorial work on two monthly papers, the Pacific Banner and the Acorn. Her first volume of poems was Phlox (Bath, Maine, 1888). This was followed during the same year by a second volume, May Flowers (Bath, Maine, 1888). Then she published Gems Without Polish (New York, 1890). She next wrote two juvenile books, one for boys and the other for girls, in the interest of the Lend-A-Hand Clubs. Most of her books first appeared as serials. Among them were Jewel Gatherers, Quaker John in the Civil War, How the Little Cousins Formed a Museum, The Peace-Makers, and Self-exiled from Russia, a story of the Mennonites.

Douglas was State superintendent of the department of peace and arbitration of the WCTU. She also assisted the national peace department of that organization, by preparing much of its necessary literature and by founding a peace band for children, which had branches in Palestine and Australia.

By religion, she was Methodist. Douglas died January 6, 1943.

== Selected works ==
- Phlox, 1888
- May Flowers, 1888
- Gems Without Polish, 1890
- Jewel Gatherers
- Quaker John in the Civil War
- How the Little Cousins Formed a Museum
- The Peace-Makers
- Self-exiled from Russia

== See also ==
- List of people from Bath, Maine
