= John Adams Jackson =

American sculptor

- Born: November 5, 1825; Bath, Maine, US
- Died: August 30, 1879 (aged 53); Pracchia, Tuscany
- Occupation: sculptor
- Known for: busts, statues
- Notable work: The Reading Girl

John Adams Jackson (November 5, 1825 – August 30, 1879) was an American sculptor noted for his portraits and monuments.

== Life ==
Jackson was born November 5, 1825, in Bath, Maine, and apprenticed to a machinist in Boston, where he gave evidence of talent by modelling a bust of Thomas Buchanan Read. There he studied linear and geometrical drawing and produced crayon portraits. Going abroad in 1853, he visited Florence, where he created several portrait busts in marble, then went to Paris in 1854, where he studied academic life drawing at the Académie Suisse. In 1858 he went to New York City, remaining until 1860, when he moved to Florence, Italy, which was afterward his home. Jackson died in Pracchia in Tuscany on August 30, 1879.

== Works ==
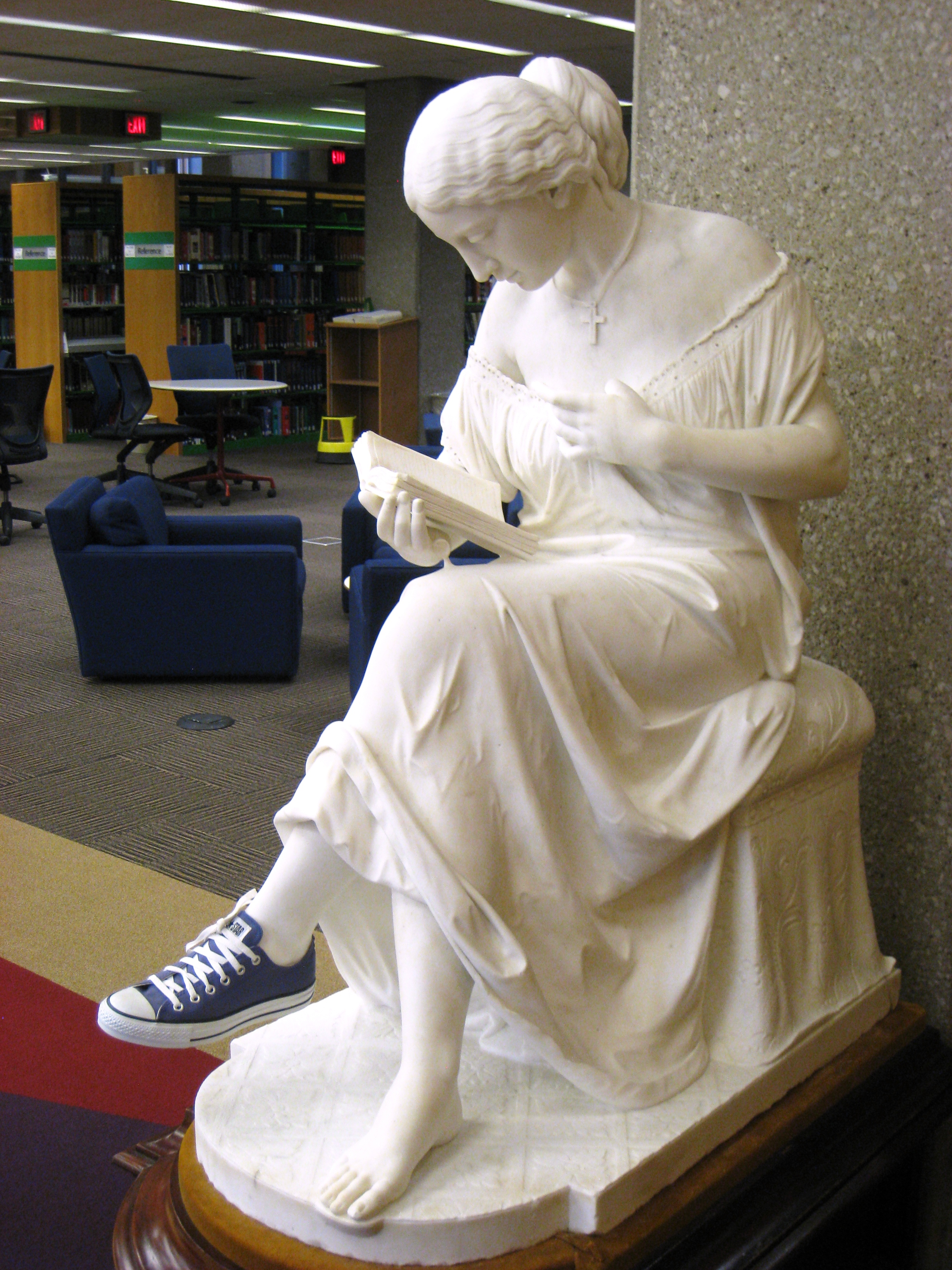
The Reading Girl

Jackson's portrait busts include those of Daniel Webster (1851); Adelaide Phillips (1853); Wendell Phillips (1854); "Eve and the Dead Abel" (1862); "Autumn"; "Cupid Stringing his Bow"; "Titania and Nick Bottom"; "The Culprit Fay" (many times repeated); "Dawn" (repeated); "Peace"; "Cupid on a Swan"; "The Morning Glory" (a medallion repeated fourteen times); "Reading Girl" (1869); "Nusidora" (Vienna Exposition, 1873); "Hylas" (1875); and "Il Pastorello," an Abruzzi peasant-boy with his goat. He designed a statue of Dr. Elisha Kane, the arctic explorer, for the Kane monument association (1860); a group intended for the southern gate-house of the former Croton Lower Reservoir in Central Park, New York (1867, not installed); and the Civil War soldiers' monument at Lynn, Massachusetts (1874).

== Sources ==
- Appleton's Cyclopedia of American Biography, edited by James Grant Wilson and John Fiske, New York: D. Appleton and Company, 1887–1889
