= William King (Maine governor) =

American merchant and politician (1768–1852)

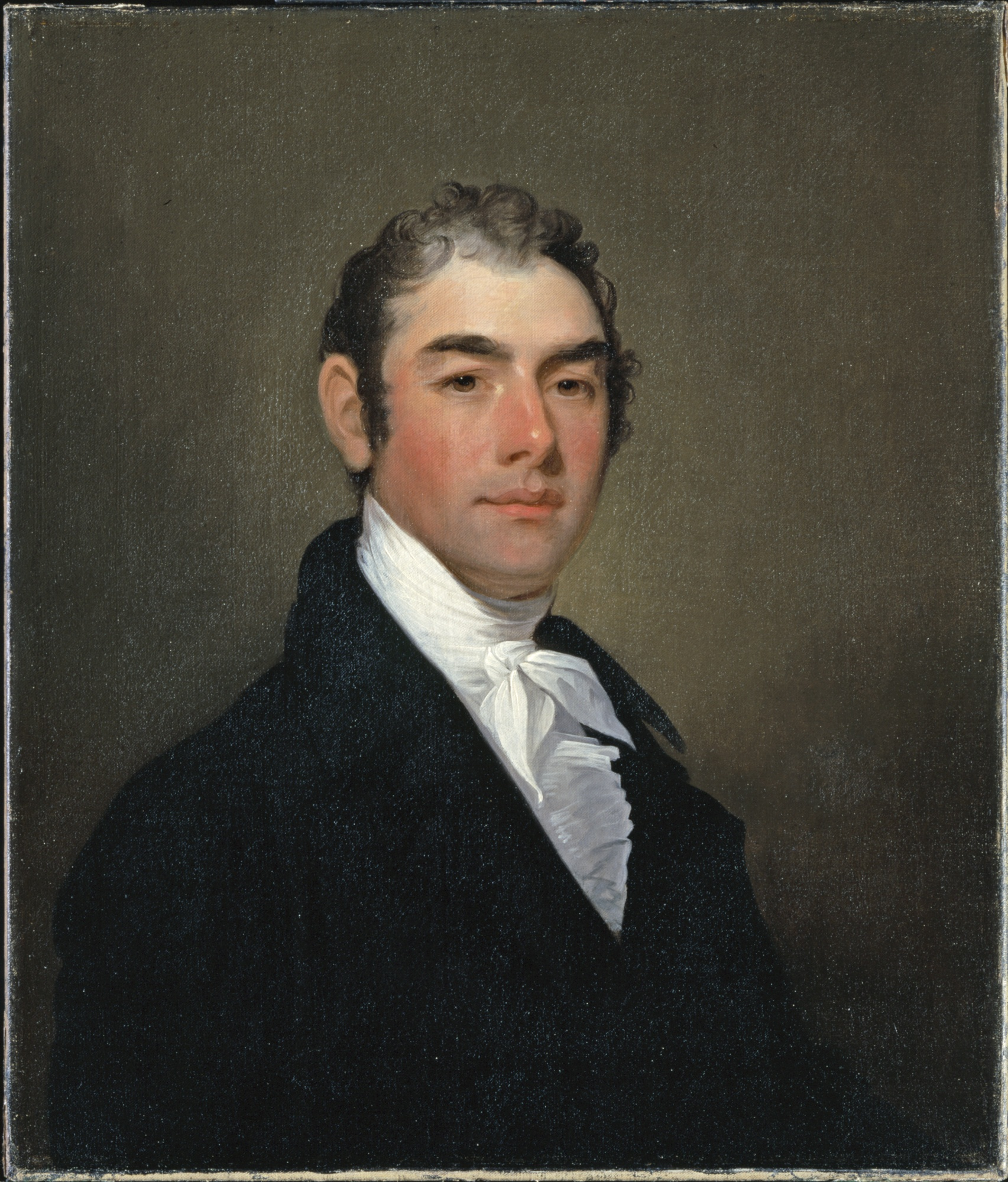
- portrait by Gilbert Stuart, 1806

1st Governor of Maine
- In office March 15, 1820 – May 28, 1821
- Succeeded by: William D. Williamson

Member of the Massachusetts Senate
- In office 1807–1811; 1816–1820

Member of the Massachusetts House of Representatives
- In office 1795–1799

Personal details
- Born: February 9, 1768 Scarborough, Province of Massachusetts Bay, British America
- Died: June 17, 1852 (aged 84) Bath, Maine, U.S.
- Party: Democratic-Republican

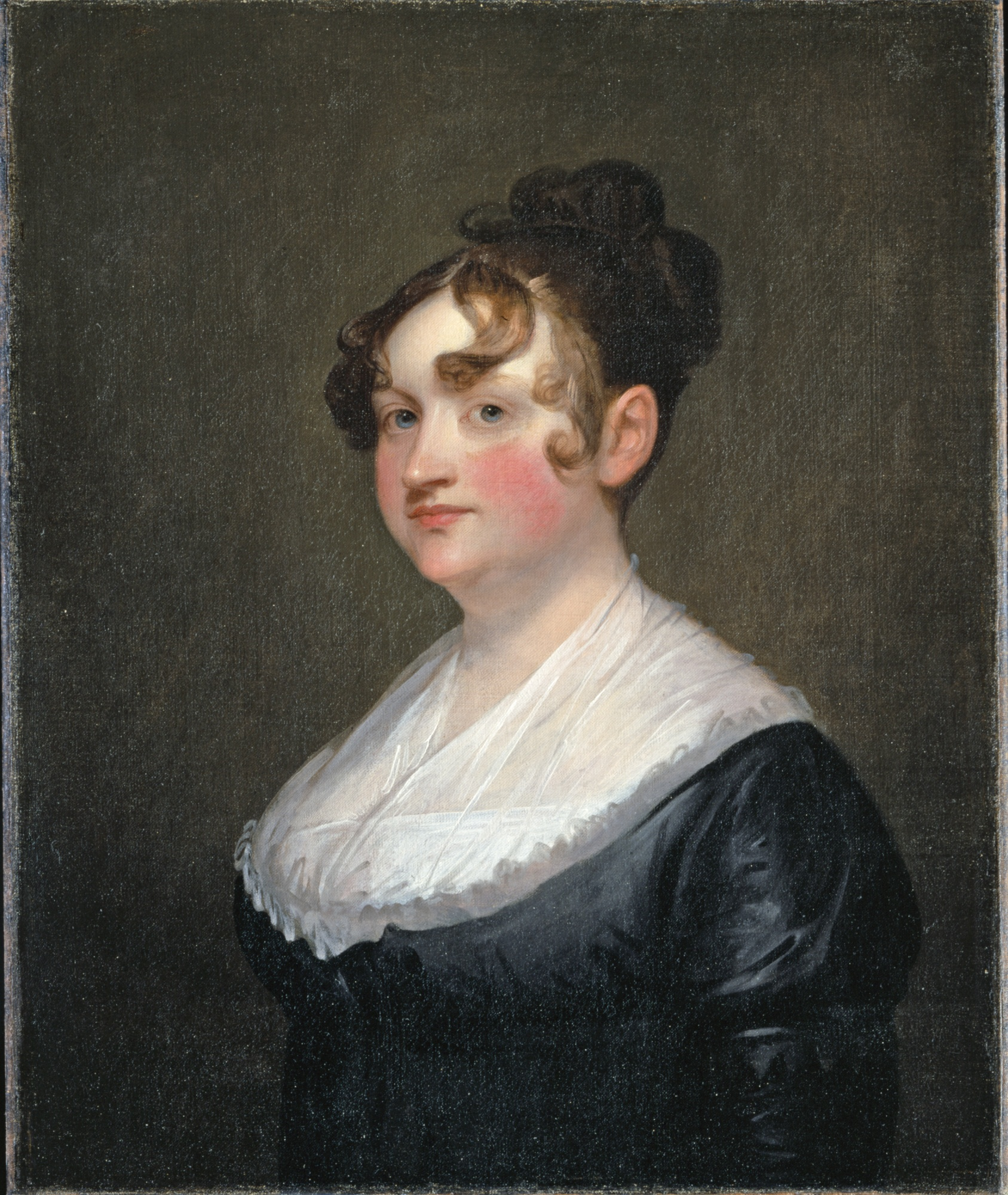
Ann Frazier King (1782-1857), portrait by Gilbert Stuart

William King (February 9, 1768 – June 17, 1852) was an American merchant, shipbuilder, army officer, and statesman from Bath, Maine. A proponent of statehood for Maine, he became its first governor when it separated from Massachusetts in 1820. He was the half-brother of Rufus King, who was a member of the Confederation Congress from Massachusetts, delegate to the Constitutional Convention of 1787, served as United States Senator from New York (from 1789 to 1796 and again from 1813 to 1825), and as Minister Plenipotentiary to the Court of St. James from 1796 to 1803 and again from 1825 to 1826.

== Personal and business career ==
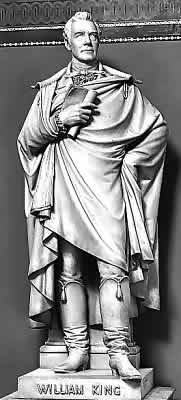
Statue of King in the National Statuary Hall Collection at the U.S. Capitol

William King was born to Richard King, a merchant and shipowner, and Mary Black, on February 9, 1768, at Scarborough, then in the Province of Massachusetts Bay. His formal education was limited to local schools (he spent one term at Phillips Academy) and ended when he was thirteen. He was largely self-educated. Starting as a hand in a saw-mill, he went on to open his own mill.

King was employed in a wide variety of businesses, including as a shipbuilder, then a ship-owner. He became the largest merchant shipping owner in Maine. He became a successful merchant and a significant real-estate investor. He opened the first cotton mill in Maine, at Brunswick. He founded and was president of the first bank of Bath.

In 1812, what is now known as the Stone House, King's summer retreat, was built in rural Bath.

King was a Scottish Rite Freemason and later – while he was the Governor of the State – he became the first (Past) Grand Master of Maine, elected in June 1820, by the representatives of twenty-four Lodges which "met, adopted a Constitution, and elected officers".

== Political career ==
King became active politically in 1795 as a member of the Democratic-Republican Party. He represented Topsham in the Massachusetts House of Representatives in 1795 and 1799. After he moved to Bath, he represented that town in 1804. He served in the Massachusetts Senate for Lincoln County from 1807 to 1811.

When the War of 1812 began, Massachusetts made him major general of the militia, in charge of the District of Maine. He devoted much of his attention to coastal shipping and defenses. He also led recruiting efforts for the regular army, for which he was made a colonel in the United States Army. In 1813 King began a seven-year effort that started with his petition to Massachusetts for separation.

In 1816 he was re-elected to the Massachusetts Senate, and finally secured their approval for Maine to become a separate state, in 1818. The Missouri Compromise allowed Maine to be recognized as a state on March 15, 1820. He was shortly thereafter elected governor of the new state.

In May 1821, President James Monroe named him as one of three commissioners to settle land claims from the 1819 Adams–Onís Treaty known as the Spanish Claims Commission. King resigned as governor on May 28, 1821, to take the position of U.S. commissioner, serving until 1824.

In 1828 he was appointed by president Andrew Jackson to serve as Customs Collector of Bath.

With the shifting of political parties, he ran once more for governor, as a Whig in 1835, but lost.

== Later life ==
King continued as a prominent business man, investor, and ship-owner. Even though he had a very limited education, he served for years as a trustee and overseer of Bowdoin College, and as a trustee of Waterville College (now called Colby College).

He died at home, in Bath, Maine, on June 17, 1852, and is buried in the city's Maple Grove Cemetery.

== Legacy ==
In 1878, the State of Maine placed the William King statue by sculptor Franklin Simmons in the National Statuary Hall of the U.S. Capitol Building. In 1902, a descendent placed a plaque on a boulder at the King Burial Ground in Scarborough to memorialize Richard King and his sons, including William. In 2024, the Scarborough Historical Society added an information sign to provide additional information about the family.

Party political offices
Preceded by Peleg Sprague	Whig nominee for Governor of Maine; 1835	Succeeded by William Kent
Political offices
Preceded by none	Governor of Maine; 1820–1821	Succeeded by William D. Williamson
