= List of artwork at the United States Capitol complex =

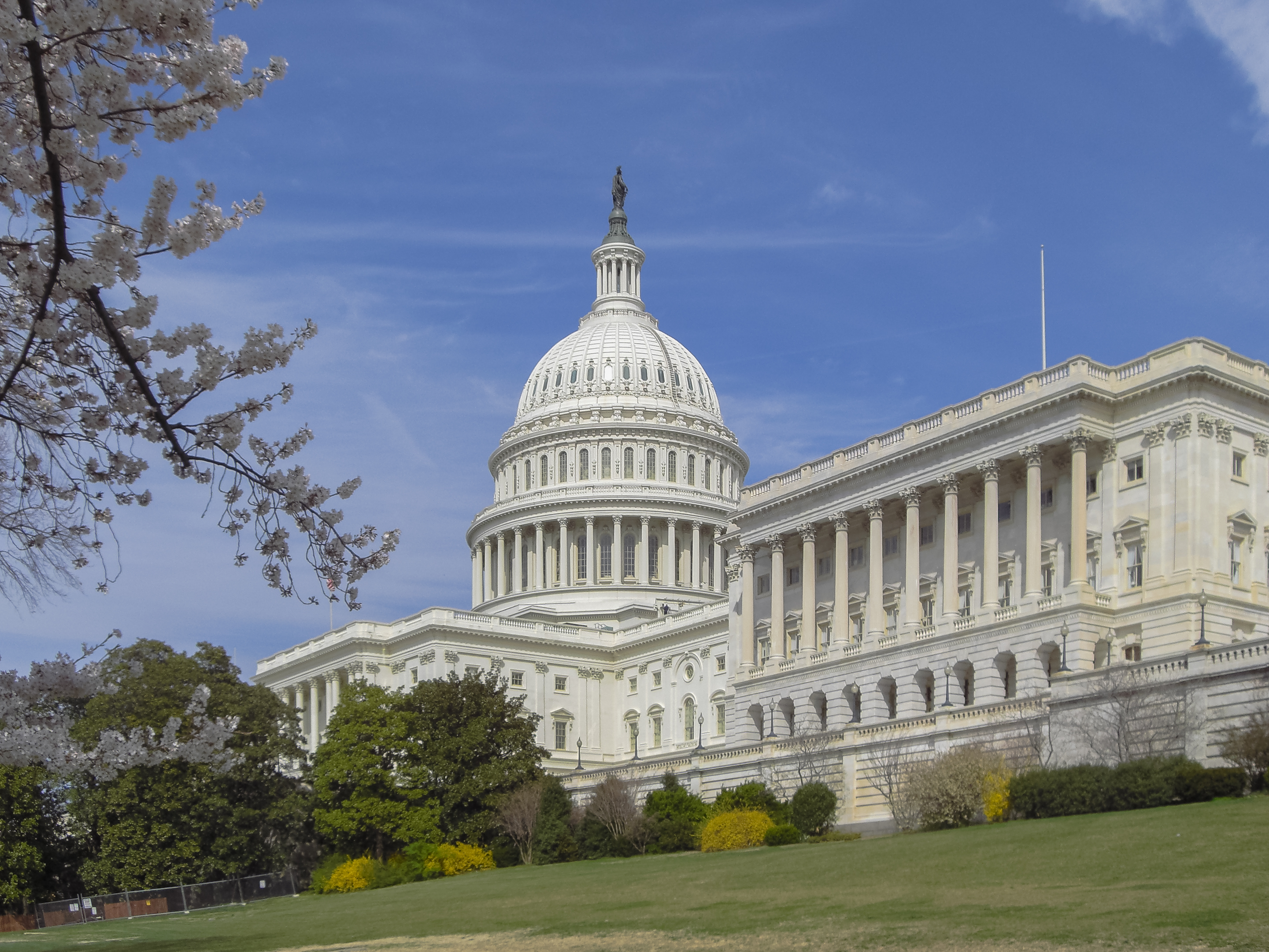
The United States Capitol. The statue crowning the dome, Statue of Freedom, is over 19 feet tall.

Since 1856, the United States Capitol Complex in Washington, D.C., has featured some of the most prominent art in the United States, including works by Constantino Brumidi, Vinnie Ream and Allyn Cox. The first recorded piece, First Cornerstone, was set in 1793, and was the first stone laid in the construction of the main Capitol Building. Since then, hundreds of pieces have been installed within the complex, including statues, oil paintings, and wall engravings. The most recent piece installed in the complex (Note: As of October 2024) is the statue of Barbara Rose Johns from the state of Virginia, unveiled in December 2025.

Many of the statues within the complex are located within the National Statuary Hall Collection, comprising two statues donated by each of the fifty states to honor persons notable in their histories. A variety of artwork and engravings are also located on the walls and interior ceiling of the United States Capitol rotunda, most notably the Frieze of American History and The Apotheosis of Washington, which covers the ceiling. Works by Constantino Brumidi are primarily located in the Brumidi Corridors, and a series of paintings by Allyn Cox are located in the "Cox Corridors", near the House Wing.

During the January 6 United States Capitol attack in 2021, rioters heavily damaged six statues and two paintings, including the Bust of Thomas Jefferson. Damage and restoration costs were estimated to be up to $25,000 (2021 USD).

== List ==
Artwork at the United States Capitol complex
Artwork	Date	Artist	Location	Medium	Image	Ref.
Abraham Lincoln bust	1908	Gutzon Borglum	Capitol crypt	Marble	A white marble bust of Abraham Lincoln's head, looking forward.	
A Cascade of Books	1983	Frank Eliscu	James Madison Memorial Building	Bronze	A green-brown sculpture that shows books falling down in a waterfall shape. The camera is panned up, looking at the sculpture	
Abraham Lincoln statue	1871	Vinnie Ream	Capitol Rotunda	Marble	A marble statue of Abraham Lincoln in a suit. He has a robe and boots on, and the statue is on a pedestal of the same material.	
Abraham Lincoln	2004	Ned Bittinger	U.S. Capitol Building	Oil on canvas	The setting includes numerous details of the Chamber’s appearance in the 1840s, including the voluminous red drapery, the George Washington portrait, and the furniture designed by Thomas Constantine.	
Alaskan Purchase	1994	Allyn Cox	"Cox Corridors", U.S. Capitol Building	Oil on canvas	A painting showing Alaska and it's mountains. Alaska is centerd in the image, and text reading "ALASKAN PURCHASE 1867" rests under the painting.	
Albany, 1754	1974	Allyn Cox	"Cox Corridors", U.S. Capitol Building	Oil on canvas	A painting of a yellow house surrounded by trees. Below the house is a garland with blue ribbons.	
Alexander Hamilton statue	1868	Horatio Stone	Hall of Columns	Marble	A white marble statue of Alexander Hamilton, who is in a coat and skinny pants. He is holding his right hand to his chest, and the statue is on a grey marble pedestal.	
Alexander Hamilton Stephens statue	1927	Gutzon Borglum	National Statuary Hall	Marble	A marble statue of Alexander Hamilton. He is sitting, his legs crossed, with his left leg over his right. His head is turned right, and the statue itself is on a relatively short pedestal.	
Alfonso X, relief portrait	1950	Gaetano Cecere	House Chamber	Marble	A dark-grey marble side-bust of Alfonso X. He has long hair, a bear, and a crown that tops his head. He is looking left, and leaves wrap around the circular engraving that the side-bust sits in. Below the work is the text "ALFONSO X".	
Amateis Doors	1908	Louis Amateis	House Wing, U.S. Capitol Building	Bronze	A brown bronze door between two grey walls. The door has eight indents, two on each side. The door is engraved with small dioramas.	
Amelia Earhart statue	2022	George Lundeen and Mark Lundeen	National Statuary Hall	Bronze		
America and History	1855-1863	Constantino Brumidi	Capitol Rotunda	Plaster	An uncolored engraving of American history. On the left of the engraving is an eagle pushing into flight, and above that is what looks like Orville Wright, taking off in his airplane. To the right of the eagle is a woman with a stick sitting down, looking expressionlessly to the left. In the center is a warrior, a shield in his left hand and spear in his right, standing defiantly. To the left of him is a scribe, resting her head on the warrior's shield. To the very right are other soldiers with swords, in various positions.	
America at Peace	1944	Rockwell Kent	Longworth House Office Building	Oil on canvas	A painting of an ocean. The sky is blue, and an airplane is in the center of the image, flying towards the camera. An island sits in the ocean to the bottom of the image, and angels sit at the top of the image.	
American Army Entering the City of Mexico	1855-1863	Filippo Costaggini	Capitol Rotunda	Plaster	An uncolored engraving showing several people looking at each other, with a divide between the 2 groups. The people are adorned with old, medieval clothing, and appear to be soldiers.	
Andrew Jackson statue	1928	Belle Kinney and Leopold Scholz	Capitol Rotunda	Bronze	A brown bronze statue of Andrew Jackson. He has a cape, and his right hand is on his hip. His left leg is forward, and he looks to the left, with a blank stare. He is wearing high boots, and the statue itself is on a pedestal of the same material.	
Annapolis, 1783	1974	Allyn Cox	"Cox Corridors", U.S. Capitol Building	Oil on canvas	A painting showing downtown Annapolis, Maryland. A church building is in the center of the image, surrounded by trees, and a green garland adorned with blue ribbons sits below it. Text directly under the church painting says "ANNAPOLIS, 1783".	
Apotheosis of Democracy pediment	1916	Paul Wayland Bartlett	House wing, U.S. Capitol Building	Marble	A diorama of statues right below the peak of a stone roof, engraved in the wall. In the middle of the diorama is a woman holding out her right hand with a robe on, and several farmers look on. The entire diorama is made of marble.	
Apotheosis of Washington	1865	Constantino Brumidi	Capitol Rotunda	Oil on canvas	A view looking directly up at the ceiling of a rotunda. A circular painting covers the highest portion, and on the painting are several dioramas of political figures of early American history and other things which cannot be made out. The painting is in color, and circles outline the edges of the painting.	
Arthur H. Vandenberg Room plaque	1951		Arthur H. Vandenberg Room, U.S. Capitol Building	Bronze	A black-and-gold plaque. On the plaque is text that reads "THIS ROOM IS DEDICATED TO ARTHUR H. WANDENBURG, UNITED STATES SENATOR FROM MICHIGAN", and text below that is unable to be distinguished from the plaque itself.	
Baltimore, 1776	1974	Allyn Cox	"Cox Corridors", U.S. Capitol Building	Oil on canvas	A painting of a building in Baltimore, Maryland. The building, yellow in color with several windows lining it's exterior walls, is surrounded by trees. Below the painting is a painted garland with blue ribbons, and directly below the building is the text "BALTIMORE, 1776".	
Baptism of Pocahontas	1837	John Gadsby Chapman	Capitol Rotunda	Oil on canvas	John Gadsby Chapman depicts Pocahontas, wearing white, being baptized Rebecca by Anglican minister Alexander Whiteaker in Jamestown, Virginia; this event is believed to have taken place in 1613 or 1614. She kneels, surrounded by family members and colonists. Her brother Nantequaus turns away from the ceremony. The baptism took place before her marriage to Englishman John Rolfe, who stands behind her. Their union is said to be the first recorded marriage between a European and a Native American. The scene symbolizes the belief of Americans at the time that Native Americans should accept Christianity and other European ways. Chapman (1808-1889), born in Alexandria, Virginia, studied art in Italy and became known for his portrait and historical paintings and his rich use of color.	
Barry Goldwater statue	2015	Deborah Copenhaver Fellows	National Statuary Hall	Bronze		
Battle of Lexington	1855-1863	Filippo Costaggini	Capitol Rotunda	Plaster	This panel depicts the "shot heard 'round the world" at the Battle of Lexington, the first major battle of the American Revolutionary War. Major John Pitcairn is shown on horseback at center, with British Army or Royal Marines troops to the right and Lexington militiamen at left.	
Benjamin Henry Latrobe portrait	1974	Allyn Cox	"Cox Corridors", U.S. Capitol Building	Oil on canvas	A painting depicting a portrait of Benjamin Henry Latrobe. He is wearing a black suit, and the portrait is cut off at his shoulders. He has a white bowtie, and looks forward with a blank expression. Leaves surround him, and a garland with blue ribbons hangs under him. Text directly below the portrait says "LATROBE".	
Billy Graham Jr. statue	2024	Chas Fagan	National Statuary Hall	Bronze		
Boone at Cumberland Gap	1994	Allyn Cox	"Cox Corridors", U.S. Capitol Building	Oil on canvas	A painting of several men and women. A man on the left holds a rifle, and is pointing at something not in the frame. On the top-left of the image is a map of the southeastern United States, with an emphasis on Florida.	
Boston Tea Party, 1773	1994	Allyn Cox	"Cox Corridors", U.S. Capitol Building	Oil on canvas		
Brigham Young statue	1950	Mahonri Young	National Statuary Hall	Marble	A white marble statue of Brigham Young. He is sitting in a chair, and is wearing a suit. He has a blank expression on his face, and is looking directly forward. The pedestal which the statue sits atop is made of a similar, but darker, material.	
British Burn the Capitol, 1814	1974	Allyn Cox	"Cox Corridors", U.S. Capitol Building	Oil on canvas	A painting depicting British soldiers, wearing red, fighting with another army. Behind them, a fire burns. The painting is outlined by a white hexagon.	
Bronze railings of the members' private staircases	1859	Constantino Brumidi and Edmond Baudin	United States Capitol	Bronze		
Brumidi Corridors murals	1870s	Constantino Brumidi	Brumidi Corridors, U.S. Capitol Building	Oil on canvas	The vaulted, ornately decorated corridors on the first floor of the Senate wing in the U.S. Capitol Building are called the Brumidi Corridors in honor of Constantino Brumidi, the Italian artist who designed the murals and the major elements.	
Burial of DeSoto	1855-1863	Constantino Brumidi	Capitol Rotunda	Plaster	This panel depicts the burial of Spanish explorer Hernando de Soto in the Mississippi River after his death from a fever. De Soto led the largest European expedition of both 15th and 16th centuries through the Southeast and Midwest searching for gold, silver, and other valuables.	
Caesar Rodney statue	1934	Bryant Baker	Capitol crypt	Marble	A white marble statue of Caesar Rodney. In his right hand he holds a stack of books, and in his left he holds a document. He has on buckled shoes, a robe, and casual shirt, and the pedestal that the statue sits atop is made of the same material.	
Canal and Locks	1994	Allyn Cox	"Cox Corridors", U.S. Capitol Building	Oil on canvas	A painting showing a sidewalk besides a river. Horses are walking along the sidewalk, and a town is in the background. The painting is outlined by an oval "frame", and directly under the painting is the text "CANAL AND LOCKS".	
Cannon House Office Building plaque	1962		National Statuary Hall	Bronze	A bronze plaque. On the center-top is a sideview of someone's head, and the largest part of the plaque reads "CANNON HOUSE OFFICE BUILDING PURSUANT TO PUBLIC LAW 37-453 APPROVED MAY 21, 1963 THIS BUILDING WAS NAMED IN HONOR OF THE HONORABLE JOSEPH GURNEY CANNON". Smaller parts of the plaque are unintelligible, due to lighting.	
Capitol Cornerstone Ceremony, 1793	1974	Allyn Cox	"Cox Corridors", U.S. Capitol Building	Oil on canvas	A painting of George Washington, in a blue overcoat, helping lay the first stone of the Capitol. There are several onlookers, and a man in a pink overcoat holds smaller stones on a velvet pillow. The painting is outlined by a hexagonal "frame".	
Capitol Site Selection, 1791	1974	Allyn Cox	"Cox Corridors", U.S. Capitol Building	Oil on canvas	After Congress selected an area along the Potomac River for the site of the new federal city, President Washington chose French engineer Pierre Charles L'Enfant to lay out the city and design the public buildings. Here L'Enfant (center) shows the president his city plan.	
Car of History clock	1835	Carlo Franzoni and Simon Willard	National Statuary Hall	Marble	Located in National Statuary Hall of the U.S. Capitol, Clio, the Muse of History, stands in a winged chariot representing the passage of time and records events as they occur. The car rests on a marble globe on which signs of the Zodiac are carved in relief. The chariot wheel is the face of the clock; its works are by Simon Willard.	
Central North America	1994	Allyn Cox	"Cox Corridors", U.S. Capitol Building	Oil on canvas	The map shows the central section of the continent to illustrate the effect of the Louisiana Purchase (1803), the Lewis and Clark expedition, and the opening of the West. Ohio is shown with the seven ranges, the grid system that was started in eastern Ohio and was then used to map out many of the boundaries and counties across the rest of the country. The border between Arkansas and Missouri, the 36.30 parallel, is prominent because it was the boundary between the slave states and free states. The route taken by Lewis and Clark appears at the north; also shown are parts of the Oregon Trail, the Santa Fe Trail, and the Emigrant Trail. On the edge of the map appear the names of Native American tribes that had been moved west.	
Charles Bulfinch portrait	1974	Allyn Cox	"Cox Corridors", U.S. Capitol Building	Oil on canvas	A painting that depicts a portrait of Charles Bullfinch. He is in a brown coat, and is looking left with his body cut off at the shoulders. Behind him hang green garlands.	
Charles Carroll statue	1903	Richard E. Brooks	Capitol crypt	Bronze	A brown bronze statue of Charles Carroll. He is standing and his head is facing right, with a blank expression on his face.He is wearing an overcoat, pants and buckled shoes. His left hand is in his pocket, and the statue itself sits atop a marble pedestal with a gold engraving.	
Charles Marion Russell statue	1959	John B. Weaver	National Statuary Hall	Bronze	A brown bronze statue of Charles Marion Russell. He is wearing a suit and is facing the camera, with a blank expression. In his left hand is a palette, and in his right hand is a paintbrush. The pedestal that the statue sits atop is made of the same material.	
Chestnut–Gibson plaque	1999		House Wing, U.S. Capitol Building	Bronze	A bronze plaque that has engravings of two deceased guards at the Capitol. The text on the plaque reads: "IN HONOR AND REMEMBRANCE OF THE HEROISM DISPLAYED BY OFFICER JACOB JOSEPH CHESTNUT AND DETECTIVE JOHN MICHAEL GIBSON UNITED STATES CAPITOL POLICE WHO, ON JULY 24, 1998, HERE BRAVELY GAVE THEIR LIVES DEFENDING THE UNITED STATES CAPITOL DEDICATED BY THE HONORABLE J. DENNIS HASTERT, SPEAKER OF THE HOUSE OF REPRESENTATIVES, AND THE HONORABLE STROM THURMOND, PRESIDENT PRO TEMPORE OF THE UNITED STATES SENATE".	
Chief Standing Bear statue	1903	Benjamin Victor	National Statuary Hall	Bronze	The over-nine-foot statue shows Standing Bear as he might have looked at his trial. An eagle feather adorns his head, signifying that he is a warrior, and his gaze is level and direct. His necklace of bear claws represents the strength and healing power of that sacred animal, and his right arm is outstretched as he asserts that his hand and the judge's hold blood of the same color. Below his necklace hang two circular medals; such "Indian Peace Medals" or "Presidential Medals" were presented to tribal leaders by the United States Government on ceremonial occasions. These medals loosely depict those created for Presidents James Buchanan and Ulysses S. Grant. The impressionistic rendering redirects the viewer's focus to Standing Bear's native attire. In his left hand he holds a pipe tomahawk; sometimes called peace pipes, these were used in trade or presented as diplomatic gifts. His right moccasin projects forward over the edge of the statue's self-base, and his left is mostly obscured by the drape of his long blanket. The low, wide pedestal is made of black granite attached to a steel frame. The inscription on the front reads: "NEBRASKA CHIEF STANDING BEAR Manchú-Nanzhín c. 1829–1908"	
Chief Washakie statue	2000	Dave McGary	Emancipation Hall, United States Capitol Visitor Center	Bronze		
Christopher Columbus relief sculpture	1820s	Antonio Capellano	Capitol Rotunda	Marble	Above four of the large Rotunda paintings in the U.S. Capitol are decorative panels of wreaths and portraits of early explorers carved in relief into the sandstone walls. The three sculptors who decorated the Rotunda were employed during the rebuilding of the Capitol after the fire of 1814. The Christopher Columbus engraving shows him, looking right, and several plants in a spiral pattern.	
Civil Rights Bill Passes, 1866	1974	Allyn Cox	"Cox Corridors", U.S. Capitol Building	Bronze	The 1866 civil rights bill, which prohibited discrimination on the bases of race or previous condition of slavery, prefigured the 14th amendment to the Constitution. In the foreground of the mural, former slave Henry Garnet is shown speaking with newspaper editor Horace Greeley, who supported African American suffrage. In the background are the Columbus doors, which originally led to the House Chamber but were later moved to the Rotunda entrance.	
Clearing Land	1994	Allyn Cox	"Cox Corridors", U.S. Capitol Building	Oil on canvas		
Colonization of New England	1855-1863	Filippo Costaggini	Capitol Rotunda	Oil on canvas	Two settlers use a team of oxen to remove the stumps of newly felled trees while, in the background, others build a log hut next to an inland river.	
Columbus Doors	1863	Randolph Rogers	Center Building, East Portico, U.S. Capitol Building	Bronze	Two arched engraved bronze doors.	
Conflict of Daniel Boone and the Indians, 1773, relief sculpture	1820s	Enrico Causici	Capitol Rotunda, South Door	Marble	An engraving of two men fighting, one who has a rifle and the other who has an axe. Above the men are tree branches.	
Capitol Columns	1828		Hall of Columns, also located at the National Capitol Columns Monument	Marble	The National Capitol Columns located at the United States National Arboretum in Washington, D.C. The columns originally supported the old East Portico of the United States Capitol (1828). They were removed during expansion of the Capitol in 1958 and placed in the National Arboretum during the 1980s.	
Corinne Claiborne (Lindy) Boggs	2004	Ned Bittinger	U.S. Capitol Building	Oil on canvas		
Corncob or Cornstalk Columns and Capitals	1808	Benjamin Henry Latrobe	Old Supreme Court Chamber, U.S. Capitol Building	Marble		
Cornerstone Centennial Plaque	1893		United States Capitol	Bronze	A bronze plaque with engraved pillars on the right and left. Atop the pillars are eagles, and in the middle of the plaque is another eagle engraving. The plaque reads "Beneath this tablet the corner stone of the Capitol of the United States of America was laid by George Washington First President September 18, 1793".	
Cortez and Montezuma at Mexican Temple	1855-1863	Constantino Brumidi	Capitol Rotunda	Plaster	This panel shows the Spanish conquistador Hernán Cortés entering an Aztec temple, being welcomed by Moctezuma II. At the beginning of the Spanish conquest of the Aztec Empire, Moctezuma and the Aztecs honored Cortés as a god, believing that he was the returning god Quetzalcoatl. The Aztec calendar stone and cult images are based on sketches drawn by Brumidi in Mexico City.	
Covered Wagons	1994	Allyn Cox	"Cox Corridors", U.S. Capitol Building	Oil on canvas	Two different types of covered wagons are shown, along with livestock and a family of settlers cooking a meal over an open fire.	
Crawford W. Long statue	1926	J. Massey Rhind	Capitol crypt	Marble	A white marble statue of Crawford Long. He is wearing a vest and overcoat, and looks forward with a blank expression. Engraved on the pedestal that the statue sits on are the words: "GEORGIA'S TRIBUTE: CRAWFORD W LONG M D".	
Daisy Lee Gatson Bates statue	2024	Benjamin Victor	National Statuary Hall	Marble		
Daniel Webster statue	1894	Carl Conrads	National Statuary Hall	Marble	A white marble statue of Daniel Webster. He is wearing an overcoat, and is facing to the left of the camera. The pedestal that the statue sits atop has an engraving in its center, of a similar material.	
David Lynn portrait	1974	Allyn Cox	"Cox Corridors", U.S. Capitol Building	Oil on canvas	A painting depicting a portrait of David Lynn. He is wearing a grey suit with a red tie, and is looking directly forward. Behind him are green garlands and plants, and directly under him is the text "LYNN".	
Death of Tecumseh	1855-1863	Filippo Costaggini	Capitol Rotunda	Plaster	This panel depicts the death of Shawnee chief and Indian Confederation leader Tecumseh at the Battle of the Thames in Upper Canada during the War of 1812 (partially an extension of Tecumseh's War).	
Declaration of Independence	1855-1863	Filippo Costaggini	Capitol Rotunda	Plaster	Idealized depiction of John Adams, Thomas Jefferson, and Benjamin Franklin, authors of the Declaration of Independence, reading the declaration to celebrating colonists.	
Declaration of Independence	1818	John Trumbull	Capitol Rotunda	Oil on canvas	John Adams, Roger Sherman, Robert R. Livingston, Benjamin Franklin, and the principal author, Thomas Jefferson, members of the Committee of Five, who drafted the Declaration of Independence, present the declaration to the Second Continental Congress and President John Hancock on June 28, 1776 at Independence Hall in Philadelphia.	
Declaration of Independence Plaque	1932	Michael Doyle	Capitol Rotunda	Bronze	A plaque that contains a print of the original Declaration of Independence. The plaque is outlined by a blue frame, engraved with stars.	
Dennis Chavez statue	1966	Felix W. de Weldon	Senate Wing, 2nd Floor, U.S. Capitol Building	Bronze	A brown bronze statue of Dennis Chavez. He is holding a hat in his right hand, and is looking to the left. The pedestal that the statue sits atop is made of marble.	
Discovery of Gold in California	1855-1863	Constantino Brumidi	Capitol Rotunda	Plaster	Prospectors dig and pan for gold with picks, shovels, and other tools in this depiction of the California Gold Rush. In the center, three men, one possibly representing John Sutter, examine a prospector's pan. This was the last scene designed by Brumidi and painted by Costaggini.	
Discovery of the Mississippi by De Soto	1855	William H. Powell	Capitol Rotunda	Oil on canvas	At the center of the canvas, Spanish navigator and conquistador Hernando de Soto rides a white horse. De Soto and his troops approach Native Americans in front of tepees, with a chief holding a ceremonial pipe. The foreground is filled by weapons and soldiers to represent the devastating battle at Mauvila (or Mabila), in which de Soto suffered a Pyrrhic victory over Choctaws under Tuscaloosa. To the right, a monk prays as a large crucifix is set into the ground.	
Doric Columns			Capitol crypt, Old Supreme Court Chamber, Cannon House Office Building, Russell Senate Office Building	Marble		
Dr. Mary McLeod Bethune statue	2022	Nilda M. Comas	National Statuary Hall	Marble		
Dr. Norman E. Borlaug statue	2014	Benjamin Victor	National Statuary Hall	Bronze		
Drying Cod	1994	Allyn Cox	"Cox Corridors", U.S. Capitol Building	Oil on canvas	Representing the Great Banks and North Atlantic fisheries, this vignette depicts salt bins, a rod shed, and a pier; a three-masted ship is seen offshore.	
Dwight D. Eisenhower statue	2003	Jim Brothers	Capitol Rotunda	Bronze	A bronze sculpture depicting the former U.S. president of the same name by Jim Brothers, installed in the U.S. Capitol's rotunda, in Washington, D.C., as part of the National Statuary Hall Collection. The statue was gifted by the U.S. state of Kansas in 2003, and replaced one depicting George Washington Glick. Eisenhower is wearing officer's clothing, and is pointing forward. The text on the pedestal that the statue sits atop reads: "KANSAS".	
Edward Clark portrait	1974	Allyn Cox	"Cox Corridors", U.S. Capitol Building	Oil on canvas	A painting depicting a portrait of David Lynn. He is wearing a grey suit with a blue bowtie, and is looking directly forward. Behind him are green garlands and plants, and directly under him is the text "CLARK".	
Edward Dickinson Baker statue	1876	Horatio Stone	Hall of Columns	Marble	The statue of Edward Dickinson Baker in the Hall of Columns of the U.S. Capitol depicts Baker as a legislator. The toga worn over his suit recalls statues of Roman senators. The use of white Italian marble and the classical garment are typical of the neoclassical style practiced by American sculptors in the 19th century. At his feet, a plumed military hat rests on a book, which sits upon a sword symbolic of his military service. On the front of the self base, the name "BAKER" appears in raised letters.	
Edward Douglass White statue	1955	Arthur C. Morgan	United States Capitol Visitor Center	Bronze	A brown bronze statue of Edward Douglass White. He is wearing a judge's robe, and is carrying a book in his left hand while his right hand is positioned to his side. The pedestal that the statue sits atop is made of a similar material.	
Edward I, relief portrait	1950	Laura Gardin Fraser	House Chamber	Marble	A sideview of Edward I. He had a crown atop his head, and is facing to the left. Wrapping around the circular frame are leaves, and under the sculpture are the words "EDWARD I".	
Edward Lewis Bartlett statue	1971	Felix W. de Weldon	House connecting corridor, 2nd floor, U.S. Capitol Building	Bronze	A brown bronze statue of Edward Lewis Bartlett. He is holding a paper in his hand, and his left leg is elevated higher than his right on a step. He is looking forward, and has a blank expression on his face.	
Elliott Woods portrait	1974	Allyn Cox	"Cox Corridors", U.S. Capitol Building	Oil on canvas	A painting depicting a portrait of Elliott Woods. He is wearing a grey suit with a blue tie, and is looking directly forward. Behind him are green garlands and plants, and directly under him is the text "WOODS".	
Embarkation of the Pilgrims	1843	Robert W. Weir	Capitol Rotunda	Oil on canvas	Protestant pilgrims are shown on the deck of the ship Speedwell before their departure for the New World from Delfshaven, Holland, on July 22, 1620. William Brewster, holding the Bible, and pastor John Robinson leading Governor Carver, William Bradford, Miles Standish, and their families in prayer. The prominence of women and children suggests the importance of the family in the community. At the left side of the painting is a rainbow, which symbolizes hope and divine protection. The rainbow colors are intentionally atypical with red-white-blue, the colors of the Dutch flag.	
Ephraim McDowell statue	1929	Charles H. Niehaus	United States Capitol Visitor Center	Bronze	A brown bronze statue of Ephraim McDowell. He is in a thinking position and has his left hand on his hip. On the pedestal that the statue sits on is the word "KENTUCKY".	
Ernest Gruening statue	1977	George Anthonisen	United States Capitol Visitor Center	Bronze	A brown bronze statue of Ernest Gruening. He is standing forward, and has his left hand in his pocket. On the pedestal that the statue sits on is the word "ALASKA" on a gold card.	
Esther Hobart Morris statue	1960	Avard Fairbanks	Hall of Columns	Bronze	A brown bronze statue of Esther Hobart Morris. She is wearing a dress and has her right hand on a rock-like object. On the pedestal that the statue sits on are the words "ESTHER HOBART MORRIS" engraved in gold.	
Ethan Allen statue	1876	Larkin G. Mead	National Statuary Hall	Marble	A white marble statue of Ethan Allen. He is wearing old military clothing with a sailor's hat, and has on boots. To his right in a sword, and the pedestal that the statue sits atop is made of the same material.	
Eusebio Kino statue	1965	Suzanne Silvercruys	United States Capitol Visitor Center	Bronze	A green bronze statue of Eusebio Kino. He has his right hand stretched outward, and is wearing a robe. The pedestal that the statue sits atop is made of granite, and is engraved with the word "ARIZONA".	
Explorers' Portage	1994	Allyn Cox	"Cox Corridors", U.S. Capitol Building	Oil on canvas	Trappers carry a birch-bark canoe across a rapids in a stream.	
Fame & Peace Crowning George Washington	1827	Antonio Capellano and G. Gianetti	East central portico, U.S. Capitol Building	Marble	Bust of George Washington flanked by allegories of Peace holding a palm branch and Fame blowing a trumpet, marble relief (1959–60) by G. Gianetti, based on the 1827 sandstone original by Antonio Capellano	
Father Damien statue	1969	Marisol Escobar	Hall of Columns	Bronze	The bronze statue is based on photographs taken of Father Damien near the end of his life, with the scars of his disease visible on his face and his right arm in a sling beneath his cloak. His broad-brimmed hat was traditionally worn by missionaries. His right hand holds a cane.	
Father Junipero Serra statue	1931	Ettore Cadorin	National Statuary Hall	Bronze	A brown bronze statue of Father Junipero Serra. In his right he holds up a cross, and in his left hand is an object that resembles a crown. He is wearing a robe, and on the pedestal are the words "JUNIPERO SERRA".	
Federal Vases	1868	Horatio Stone	East Front Vestibule, Capitol Rotunda	Bronze	The Federal Vases are part of a group of three; the third, larger vase, entitled "Republic," is located at the Pomona College Montgomery Art Gallery in Claremont, California. The vases in the Capitol are identical, and sit on pedestals between a door.	
First Capitol Inauguration, 1829	1974	Allyn Cox	"Cox Corridors", U.S. Capitol Building	Oil on canvas	Andrew Jackson, the first president to be inaugurated outdoors at the Capitol, is shown taking the oath from Chief Justice John Marshall. This ceremony on the east front portico began a tradition observed by most presidents until 1981, when inaugurations were moved to the west front.	
First Cornerstone	1793	Caleb Bentley	United States Capitol	Marble		
First Reading of the Emancipation Proclamation of President Lincoln	1864	Francis Bicknell Carpenter	United States Capitol	Oil on canvas		
First Library of Congress Plaque	2012		Library of Congress	Bronze	A black-ang-gold bronze plaque that reads: "THE FIRST LIBRARY OF CONGRESS 1802-1804 1810-1814 THIS TABLET MARKS THE ORIGINAL LOCATION OF THE LIBRARY OF CONGRESS. AT OTHER TIMES BETWEEN 1800 AND 1810 THE HOUSE OF REPRESENTATIVES, THE SENATE AND THE SUPREME COURT MET IN THESE QUARTERS. ON AUGUST 24, 1814 THE BRITISH CAPTURED WASHINGTON AND SET FIRE TO THE CAPITOL. THE BOOKS IN THE LIBRARY WERE USED TO KINDLE THE FLAMES THAT DESTROYED THIS SECTION OF THE BUILDING". To the right of the plaque is an American flag.	
First Meeting Place of the House of Representatives in the Capitol Plaque	1951		United States Capitol	Bronze	A bronze plaque. On the plaque is text, reading: "THE FIRST MEETING PLACE OF THE HOUSE OF REPRESENTATIVES 1800 - 1801 1804 - 1807".	
First Senate Chamber in the Capitol Plaque	1951		United States Capitol	Bronze	A bronze plaque. On the plaque is text, reading: "THE FIRST SENATE CHAMBER 1800 - 1808 THIS TABLET MARKS THE LOCATION OF THE FIRST SENATE CHAMBER IN THE CAPITOL. HERE, ON NOVEMBER 21, 1800 THE SENATE MET FOR THE FIRST TIME IN WASHINGTION - FOR THE SECOND SESSION OF THE SIXTH CONGRESS, HERE, PRESIDENT JOHN ADAMS, ON NOVEMBER 22, 1800, DELIVERED HIS LAST ANNUAL MESSAGE TO BOTH HOUSES. HERE, THOMAS JEFFERSON, AFTER PRESIDING OVER THE SENATE DURING THE SESSION, TOOK OATH OF OFFICE, ON MARCH 4, 1801, FROM CHIEF JUSTICE JOHN MARSHALL, AS PRESIDENT OF THE UNITED STATES AND DELIVERED HIS FIRST INAUGURAL ADDRESS".	
Flight 93 Memorial Plaque	2009	Architecture Division of the Architect of the Capitol	United States Capitol	Bronze	A gold bronze plaque with the names of passengers of United Airlines Flight 93. In the middle of the plaque is an engraved garland that loops twice.	
Florence R. Sabin statue	1959	Joy Buba	Hall of Columns	Bronze	A brown bronze statue of Florence R. Sabin. She is sitting at a desk, and has her legs crossed, with her right leg over her left. The pedestal is square and made of granite, with the word "COLORADO" being engraved in gold on it.	
Fort St. Augustine	1994	Allyn Cox	"Cox Corridors", U.S. Capitol Building	Oil on canvas	Fort St. Augustine with its arrowhead-shaped bastions is shown in an aerial view.	
Frances E. Willard statue	1905	Helen Farnsworth Mears	National Statuary Hall	Marble	A white marble statue of Frances E. Willard. She is wearing a dress, and has her right hand draped over a lectern. In her left hand are several papers, and she is looking forward with a blank expression. The pedestal is made of the same material.	
Francis Harrison Pierpont statue	1910	Franklin Simmons	National Statuary Hall	Marble	A white marble statue of Francis Harrison Pierpont. He is wearing an overcoar, and in his right hand is a rolled-up piece of paper. The pedestal is made of the same material, and the words "FRANCIS H PIERPONT" are engraved on it's cap in gold.	
Francis Preston Blair statue	1899	Alexander Doyle	National Statuary Hall	Marble	A white marble statue of Francis Preston Blair. His left arm is resting on a pillar, and he had his right hand on his hip. He is wearing an overcoat, and on the cap of the pedestal is the word "BLAIR" engraved in gold.	
Frederick Douglass statue	2013	Steven Weitzman	Emancipation Hall, United States Capitol Visitor Center	Bronze	The statue, which is approximately seven feet tall, depicts Douglass as a man in his fifties in the act of giving a speech with a determined expression. He stands beside a lectern, leaning slightly forward and holding up a crushed sheaf of papers. His left hand firmly grasps the top of the lectern, where an inkwell and a quill pen sit in reference to his work as an author. He is dressed in a formal double-breasted frock coat, bow tie, and vest with a watch chain. The statue's pedestal is two and one-half feet high and is clad in pink marble.	
Frieze of American History	1877	Horatio Stone	Capitol Rotunda	Plaster	The Frieze of American History in the Rotunda of the United States Capitol contains a painted panorama depicting significant events in American history. The frieze’s 19 scenes is the work of three artists: Constantino Brumidi, Filippo Constaggini and Allyn Cox. The frieze is painted in grisaille, a monochrome of whites and browns that resembles sculpture. It measures 8 feet 4 inches in height and approximately 300 feet in circumference. It starts 58 feet above the floor.	
From Texas to the Pacific Ocean	1994	Allyn Cox	"Cox Corridors", U.S. Capitol Building	Oil on canvas	The map shows the states and territories stretching west from Texas to the Pacific Ocean and marks the Oregon, California, and Old Spanish Trails as well as the Pony Express route. Also shown are Sutter's Fort, where gold was discovered in California; the sites of Spanish missions and forts; and the names of Indian tribes. In the ocean is a clipper ship of the type that sailed around the tip of South America from California to the east coast of the United States.	
From the Atlantic Ocean to the Mississippi River	1994	Allyn Cox	"Cox Corridors", U.S. Capitol Building	Oil on canvas	The map shows the states and territories between the Atlantic Ocean and the Mississippi River. Important cities (state capitals, trade centers, or otherwise influential in westward expansion) are indicated, and the names of Native American tribes appear to the north and west.	
Fur Trade	1994	Allyn Cox	"Cox Corridors", U.S. Capitol Building	Oil on canvas	A longhouse of the northwest is decorated with paintings and set amid totems. Before the building, a fur trader is trading guns to the Native Americans for furs.	
Gabriel “Gabe” Zimmerman Plaque	2013		Gabriel Zimmerman Meeting Room, U.S. Capitol Building	Bronze	A bronze plaque. Engraved in the center of the place is the head and shoulders of Gabriel Zimmerman. The plaque reads: "GABRIEL ZIMMERMAN MEETING ROOM GABRIEL “GABE” ZIMMERMAN COMMITTED PUBLIC SERVANT; FRIEND TO ALL 1980-2011 THIS MEETING ROOM IS DEDICATED IN MEMORY OF GABE ZIMMERMAN, WHO WAS SHOT AND KILLED SERVING THE PEOPLE OF ARIZONA WHILE CARRYING OUT HIS DUTIES AS AN AIDE TO REPRESENTATIVE GABRIELLE GIFFORDS. HIS DEDICATION TO COMMUNITY AND TO THE DEMOCRATIC PROCESS INSPIRES US TO HELP EACH OTHER AS FELLOW HUMAN BEINGS AND AS CITIZENS OF A CARING NATION".	
Gaius, relief portrait	1950	Joseph Kiselewski	House Chamber	Marble	A grey marble sideview of Gaius. He is looking to the right, and surrounding the circular frame is a laurel wreath. Under the engraving is the text "GAIUS".	
Garfield Monument	1887	John Quincy Adams Ward	First Street, S.W., and Maryland Avenue, U.S. Capitol grounds	Bronze	The tapered, cylindrical granite pedestal holds four over-life-size bronze figures, with the portrait statue of Garfield at the top and three allegorical figures representing different phases of his career below. Garfield is depicted in giving a speech, gazing intently outward with a sheaf of papers in his left hand, his right hand rests on a book on a draped column. The toe of one shoe projects over the edge of the base, giving the work a sense of vigor and movement.	
General George Washington Resigning His Commission	1822- 1824	John Trumbull	Capitol Rotunda	Oil on canvas	A painting that depicts George Washington's resignation as commander-in-chief of the Army to the Congress, which was then meeting at the Maryland State House in Annapolis, on December 23, 1783. This action was of great significance in establishing civilian, rather than military rule, leading to a republic, rather than a dictatorship. Washington stands with two aides-de-camp addressing the president of the Congress, Thomas Mifflin, and others, such as Elbridge Gerry, Thomas Jefferson, James Monroe, and James Madison. Mrs. Washington and her three grandchildren are shown watching from the gallery, although they were not in fact present at the event.	
Genius of America Pediment	1825-1828	Luigi Persico	East Central Entrance, U.S. Capitol Building	Marble and sandstone	The sculptural pediment over the east central entrance of the U.S. Capitol Building is called Genius of America. The entire pediment is 81 feet 6 inches in length and the figures are 9 feet high. The central figure represents America, who rests her right arm on a shield inscribed "USA"; the shield is supported by an altar bearing the inscription "July 4, 1776." America points to Justice, who lifts scales in her left hand and in her right hand holds a scroll inscribed "Constitution, 17 September 1787." To America's left are an Eagle and the figure of Hope, who rests her arm on an anchor.The sculptural pediment over the east central entrance of the U.S. Capitol Building is called Genius of America. The entire pediment is 81 feet 6 inches in length and the figures are 9 feet high. The central figure represents America, who rests her right arm on a shield inscribed "USA"; the shield is supported by an altar bearing the inscription "July 4, 1776." America points to Justice, who lifts scales in her left hand and in her right hand holds a scroll inscribed "Constitution, 17 September 1787." To America's left are an Eagle and the figure of Hope, who rests her arm on an anchor.	
George Clinton statue	1873	Henry Kirke Brown	Senate Wing, 2nd Floor, U.S. Capitol Building	Bronze	A brown bronze statue of George Clinton. He is wearing an overcoat and in his right hand is a cane. The marble pedestal is engraved in gold with the words "NEW YORK".	
George Laird Shoup statue	1910	Frederick E. Triebel	National Statuary Hall	Marble	A white marble statue of George Laird Shoup. He is holding a book in his left hand, and is wearing an overcoat On the pedestal is a circular gold engraving, and at the base of the pedestal is the word "IDAHO".	
George M. White portrait	1974	Allyn Cox	"Cox Corridors", U.S. Capitol Building	Oil on canvas	A painting depicting a portrait of George M. White. He is wearing a blue suit with a red tie, and is looking directly forward. Behind him are green garlands and plants, and directly under him is the text "WHITE".	
George Mason, relief portrait	1950	Gaetano Cecere	House Chamber	Marble	A grey marble sideview of George Mason. He is looking to the left, and surrounding the circular frame is a laurel wreath. Under the engraving is the text "MASON".	
George Washington statue	1934	Jean Antoine Houdon	Capitol Rotunda	Bronze	A brown bronze statue of George Washington. In his right hand he holds a cane that reaches the pedestal, and in his left hand is an overcoat that is also draped over a grooved pillar. On the white marble pedestal is the word "WASHINGTON".	
George Washington's Houses Plaque	1932		Upper Senate Park, U.S. Capitol grounds	Bronze	A black-and-gold bronze plaque held up by a white granite block. On the plaque, text reads: "HERE WERE THE LOTS ACQUIRED ON OCTOBER 3, 1798 BY GENERAL GEORGE WASHINGTON AND ON WHICH HE BUILT TWO BRICK DWELLINGS FROM DESIGNS BY DR. WILLIAM THORTON A DWELLLING REMODELED FROM THE TWO DWELLINGS WAS OWNED AND OCCUPIED BY ADMIRAL CHARLES WILKES THE FAMOUS EXPLORER".	
Gerald R. Ford Jr. statue	2011	J. Brett Grill	Capitol Rotunda	Bronze		
Gilbert du Motier, Marquis de Lafayette	1823	Ary Scheffer	House Chamber	Oil on canvas		
Gold Prospectors	1994	Allyn Cox	"Cox Corridors", U.S. Capitol Building	Oil on canvas	This mural shows different methods used by prospectors in the search for wealth in California, the Yukon and Alaska.	
Golden Spike	1994	Allyn Cox	"Cox Corridors", U.S. Capitol Building	Oil on canvas	At the connection of the Union Pacific and Central Pacific railroads in Promontory, Utah, two locomotives meet and two men shake hands before a group of workers.	
Gregory IX, relief portrait	1950	Thomas Hudson Jones	House Chamber	Marble	A grey marble sideview of George Mason. He is looking to the left, and on his head is a papal hat. Surrounding the circular frame is a laurel wreath. Under the engraving is the text "GREGORY IX".	
Hammurabi, relief portrait	1950	Thomas Hudson Jones	House Chamber	Marble	A grey marble sideview of Hammurabi. He is looking to the left, and on his head is a traditional hat. Surrounding the circular frame is a laurel wreath. Under the engraving is the text "HAMMURABI".	
Hannibal Hamlin statue	1950	Charles E. Tefft	National Statuary Hall	Bronze	A brown bronze statue of Hannibal Hamlin. Over his shoulders is an overcoat, and he is wearing a vest. In his right hand is a cane, and in his left hand is a hat. Engraved on the white marble pedestal are the words "HANNIBAL HAMLIN".	
Harry S. Truman statue	2022	Tom Corbin	National Statuary Hall	Bronze	A brown bronze statue of Harry S. Truman. He is walking down steps and wearing a suit with casual shoes. On the pedestal are the words "MISSOURI, HARRY S. TRUMAN" engraved in gold.	
Helen Keller statue	2009	Edward Hlavka	National Statuary Hall	Bronze		
Henry Clay statue	1929	Charles H. Niehaus	National Statuary Hall	Bronze	A brown bronze statue of Henry Clay. In his right hand is a top hat, and in his left hand is a cane. On the upper part of the pedestal is the word "CLAY" engraved, and on the main pedestal are the words "KENTUCKY, HENRY CLAY".	
Henry Mower Rice statue	1916	Frederick E. Triebel	National Statuary Hall	Marble	A white marble statue of Henry Mower Rice. He is wearing an overcoat, and has his right hand outstretched. The pedestal is made of the same material.	
Huey Pierce Long statue	1941	Charles Keck	National Statuary Hall	Bronze	A brown bronze statue of Huey Pierce Long. His right hand is up, and he has a wide stance. He is wearing a suit, and the pedestal that the statue sits atop is made of granite.	
Hugo Grotius, relief portrait	1950	C. Paul Jennewein	House Chamber	Marble	A grey marble sideview of Grotius. He is looking to the right, and has a frilled collar. Surrounding the circular frame is a laurel wreath. Under the engraving is the text "GROTIUS".	
Hunting Game	1994	Allyn Cox	"Cox Corridors", U.S. Capitol Building	Oil on canvas	A single hunter with a long rifle stalks a squirrel and a turkey.	
In God We Trust Plaque	1962		Longworth House Office Building	Bronze	A gold-and-bronza plaque. It has a gold frame, and in the center of the plaque is the United States seal and the words "IN GOD WE TRUST" engraved in gold.	
Indian Ceremony	1994	Allyn Cox	"Cox Corridors", U.S. Capitol Building	Oil on canvas	An unusual combination of dancers in Hopi and Navajo costumes performs a ceremony.	
Innocent III, relief portrait	1950	Joseph Kiselewski	House Chamber	Marble	A grey marble sideview of Grotius. He is looking to the right, and on his head is a traditional papal cap. Surrounding the circular frame is a laurel wreath. Under the engraving is the text "INNOCENT III".	
Iron Foundry, circa 1850	1973-1974	Allyn Cox	"Cox Corridors", U.S. Capitol Building	Oil on canvas	The expansion and industrialization of America required iron and steel for railroads, bridges, skyscrapers, and tools. The mural shows work at the foundry of the Nashua, New Hampshire, Iron Company.	
Island Dance	1994	Allyn Cox	"Cox Corridors", U.S. Capitol Building	Oil on canvas	A village celebration with dancers and indigenous percussion instruments is shown in a typical Hawaiian setting.	
J. George Stewart portrait	1974	Allyn Cox	"Cox Corridors", U.S. Capitol Building	Oil on canvas	A painting depicting a portrait of J. George Steward. He is wearing a blue suit, and is looking to the right. Under him are green garlands and plants, and directly under him is the text "STEWART".	
Jack Swigert Jr. statue	1997	George Lundeen and Mark Lundeen	United States Capitol Visitor Center	Bronze		
Jacob Collamer statue	1881	Preston Powers	National Statuary Hall	Marble	A white marble statue of Jacob Collamer. He is wearing an overcoat and has his left hand on a pillar. His right hand is behind his back, and the pedestal is made of the same white marble material.	
Jacques Marquette statue	1896	Gaetano Trentanove	National Statuary Hall	Marble	A white marble statue of Jacques Marquette. He is wearing a traditional robe and is looking to the right. On the granite pedestal are the words "WISCONSIN'S TRIBUTE".	
James A. Garfield statue	1886	Charles H. Niehaus	National Statuary Hall	Marble	A white marble statue of James A. Garfield. His left hand is resting on a pillar, and he is wearing a trenchcoat and traditional boots. On the pedestal is the word "OHIO".	
James Madison statue	1976	Walker K. Hancock	James Madison Memorial Building	Marble	The statue of James Madison in James Madison Memorial Hall of the Library of Congress James Madison Memorial Building depicts him as a man in his thirties, sitting erect in a chair that is draped with a cloak; his right foot projects beyond the statue's pedestal. In his right hand is a volume of the Encyclopédie Méthodique, which was first on Madison's 1783 list of books that would be useful to the Congress. Walter Hancock sculpted the statue at his Massachusetts studio, and it was carved from a 30-ton block of Carrara marble in Italy. Madison's life dates are carved on the curved front of the pink Tennessee marble pedestal.	
James Shields statue	1893	Leonard W. Volk	National Statuary Hall	Bronze	A brown bronze statue of James Shields. He is wearing traditional confederate officer's uniform, and is looking forward with a cane in his left hand. On the pedestal are the words "WARRIOR, JURIST, STATESMAN".	
James Zachariah George statue	1931	Augustus Lukeman	United States Capitol Visitor Center	Bronze	A brown bronze statue of James Zachariah George. He is wearing an overcoat, and is holding a book in his left hand. On the granite pedestal is a bronze engraving of an eagle, and below that is the word "MISSISSIPPI".	
Jason Lee statue	1953	Gifford MacGregor Proctor	United States Capitol	Bronze	A brown bronze statue of Jason Lee. He is turned to the right, and in his right hand he holds out a piece of paper. He is wearing an overcoat and vest, and on the marble pedestal are the words "OREGON".	
Jean Baptiste Colbert, relief portrait	1950	Laura Gardin Fraser	House Chamber	Marble	A grey marble sideview of Grotius. He is looking to the left, and is wearing a traditional frilled collar. Surrounding the circular frame is a laurel wreath. Under the engraving is the text "COLBERT".	
Jeannette Rankin statue	1985	Terry Mimnaugh	Emancipation Hall, United States Capitol Visitor Center	Bronze	A brown bronze statue of Jeannette Rankin. She is wearing a dress and is looking to the right. She is holding a piece of paper in her left hand, and the pedestal is made of granite. The base of the pedestal is engraved with the word "MONTANA".	
Jefferson Davis statue	1931	Augustus Lukeman	National Statuary Hall	Bronze	A brown bronze statue of Jefferson Davis. He has a wide stance, is wearing a heavy overcoat, and is looking forward with his right hand on his shirt. On the granite pedestal is the United States seal with the word "MISSISSIPPI" engraved into it.	
John Burke statue	1963	Avard Fairbanks	National Statuary Hall	Bronze	A brown bronze statue of John Burke. Draped over his left arm is a coat, and in his left hand is a hat. Engraved on the marble pedestal is the word "NORTH DAKOTA".	
John Cabot Relief Sculpture		Antonio Capellano and Enrico Causici	Capitol Rotunda	Sandstone	A sandstone engraving in a wall. In the middle of the engraving is a sideview of John Cabot, who is facing the right. Around him are plants that spiral out to his left and right.	
John Caldwell Calhoun statue	1910	Frederic W. Ruckstull	Capitol crypt	Marble	A white marble statue of John C. Calhoun. His right hand is resting on a pillar, and he is wearing an overcoat. On the white marble pedestal is the word "SOUTH CAROLINA".	
John E. Kenna statue	1901	Alexander Doyle	National Statuary Hall	Marble	A white marble statue of John E. Kenna. In his right hand is a book, and he is wearing an unbuttoned suit and is looking to the left. On the grey pedestal is a bronze seal.	
John F. Kennedy Room plaque	1964		East Portico, U.S. Capitol Building	Bronze	A brown-and-grey bronze plaque. On the bottom of the plaque is a sideview of John F. Kennedy, and the plaque reads: "SENATOR JOHN FITZGERALD KENNEDY OCCUPIED THIS ROOM FROM THE TIME HE WAS NOMINATED FOR OFFICE OF THE PRESIDENT OF THE UNITED STATES ON JULY 13, 1960 UNTIL HIS INAUGURATION ON JANUARY 20, 1961".	
John Gorrie statue	1914	C.A. Pillars	National Statuary Hall	Marble	A white marble statue of John Gorrie. He has his right hand on his hip and is wearing an overcoat. Engraved on the pedestal is the word "FLORIDA".	
John Hanson statue	1902	Richard E. Brooks	National Statuary Hall	Bronze	A brown bronze statue of John Hanson. he is wearing a pirate's hat with an overcoat and stockings, and has a cane in his left hand and paper in his right. On the white marble pedestal is a gold United States seal, and the word "MARYLAND".	
John McLoughlin statue	1953	Gifford MacGregor Proctor	National Statuary Hall	Bronze	brown bronze statue of John McLoughlin. He i wearing a brown overcoat, and is walking forward with a cane in his right hand and a top hat in his left. Engraved on the granite pedestal is the word "OREGON".	
John Middleton Clayton statue	1934	Bryant Baker	National Statuary Hall	Marble	A white marble statue of John Middleton Clayton. He is wearing a suit, and is holding what appears to be a coat in his right hand. The pedestal is square, and is made of white granite.	
John Peter Gabriel Muhlenberg statue	1889	Blanche Nevin	Capitol crypt	Marble	A white marble statue of John Peter Gabriel Mulenberg. He is wearing a traditional suit with buckled boots, and looks to the right. The granite pedestal is in the shape of a hexagon.	
John Sevier statue	1931	Belle Kinney and Leopold Scholz	National Statuary Hall	Bronze	A brown bronze statue of John Sevier. He is wearing high boots, an overcoat and a bicorn hat, with a saber in his right hand. He has a wide stance, and engraved on the granite pedestal are the words "GENERAL JOHN SEVIER".	
John Stark statue	1894	Carl Conrads	Capitol crypt	Marble	A white marble statue of John Stark. He is wearing a tricorn, and has an overcoat on. His left hand is behind his back, and engraved on the pedestal is a gold United States seal and the words "STARK, NEW HAMPSHIRE".	
John Trumbull portrait	1974	Allyn Cox	"Cox Corridors", U.S. Capitol Building	Oil on canvas	A painting depicting a portrait of John Trumbull. He is wearing a green unbuttoned suit, and is looking to the right. Under him are green garlands and plants, and directly under him is the text "TRUMBULL".	
John Winthrop statue	1876	Richard S. Greenough	National Statuary Hall	Marble	A white marble statue of John Winthrop. He is holding a rod in his right hand, and has his left hand up to his chest. He has a frilled collar and traditional Victorian clothing, and the pedestal is made of the same white marble material.	
Jonathan Trumbull statue	1872	Chauncey B. Ives	House connecting corridor, 2nd floor, U.S. Capitol Building	Marble	A white marble statue of Jonathon Trumbull. He is wearing rove and buckled boots, and is reading a paper. Engraved on the black pedestal are the words ."CONNECTICUT".	
Joseph Ward statue	1963	Bruno Beghé	United States Capitol	Marble	A white marble statue of Joseph Ward. He is holding a folded-up paper in his left hand, ND looks slightly to the left. On the pedestal are the words "JOSEPH WARD, SOUTH DAKOTA".	
Joseph Wheeler statue	1925	Berthold Nebel	National Statuary Hall	Bronze	A brown bronze statue of Joseph Wheeler. He is holding a tricorn hat in his right hand, and has his left foot out. Engraved on the granite pedestal is the word "WHEELER".	
Justice and History Sculpture	1974	Thomas Crawford	Senate Wing, East Front, U.S. Capitol Building	Marble	The sculpture Justice and History is located above the Senate bronze doors on the U.S. Capitol's East Front. The draped female figures of Justice and History recline against a globe. Justice holds a book inscribed "Justice / Law / Order" in her left hand; her right hand rests on a pair of scales. History holds a scroll inscribed "History / July / 1776."	
Justinian I, relief portrait	1950	Gaetano Cecere	House Chamber	Marble	grey marble sideview of Justinian I. He is looking to the left, and is wearing a traditional Greek laurel wreath on his head. Surrounding the circular frame is a laurel wreath. Under the engraving is the text "JUSTINIAN".	
Kamehameha I statue	1969	Thomas R. Gould	Emancipation Hall, United States Capitol Visitor Center	Bronze	A gold bronze statue of Kamehameha I. He is holding a spear in his left hand, and is raising his right hand up. He is wearing traditional Hwaiian garments, and on the pedestal are the words: "KAMEHAMEHA I, FIRST KING OF ALL HAWAII".	
Land Grant College	1994	Allyn Cox	"Cox Corridors", U.S. Capitol Building	Oil on canvas	A painting of a beige building surrounded by people. The words "LAND GRANT COLLEGE" are painted on the frame.	
Landing of Columbus	1855-1863	Constantino Brumidi	Capitol Rotunda	Plaster	A grey engraving of the landing of Columbus. Several people are present, including women and a pair of children holding each other.	
Landing of Columbus	1847	John Vanderlyn	Capitol Rotunda	Oil on canvas	Christopher Columbus is depicted landing in the West Indies, on an island that the natives called Guanahani and he named San Salvador, on October 12, 1492. He raises the royal banner, claiming the land for his Spanish patrons, and stands bareheaded, with his hat at his feet, in honor of the sacredness of the event. The captains of the Niña and Pinta follow, carrying the banner of Ferdinand and Isabella. The crew displays a range of emotions, some searching for gold in the sand. Natives watch from behind a tree. John Vanderlyn (1775-1852) had studied with Gilbert Stuart and was the first American painter to be trained in Paris, where he worked on this canvas for ten years with the help of assistants.	
Landing of the Pilgrims	1855-1863	Constantino Brumidi	Capitol Rotunda	Plaster	A grey plaster painting of the Landing of the Pilgrims. A man on the right struggles to hold a barrel, and a man in the middle appears to be commanding him and others.	
Landing of the Pilgrims, 1620, relief sculpture	1820s	Enrico Causici	Above the East Door, Capitol Rotunda	Sandstone	A grey sandstone engraving depicting the Landing of the Pilgrims. A Native American is holding out something, presumably an offering, and a pilgrim as is hand up and looks at him menacingly.	
Lansdowne Portrait (Replica)	1834	John Vanderlyn	U.S. House of Representatives Chamber		An oil-on-canvas painting of George Washington.	
Lewis and Clark	1994	Allyn Cox	"Cox Corridors", U.S. Capitol Building	Oil on canvas	Lewis and Clark are shown on the Missouri river looking over a Mandan village.	
Lewis Cass statue	1910	Daniel Chester French	National Statuary Hall	Marble	A white marble statue of Lewis Cass. He is holding a paper in is left and, and is wearing a suit. Engraved on the pedestal are the words "LEWIS CASS".	
Lewis Wallace statue	1910	Andrew O'Connor	National Statuary Hall	Marble	A white marble statue of Lewis Wallace. He as his hands by is side, and is wearing a trenchcoat. On the square pedestal are the words: "LEW WALLACE"	
Liberty and the Eagle Sculpture	1817-1819	Enrico Causici	National Statuary Hall	Plaster	An American eagle stands to Liberty's right, and the scroll in her right hand is the Constitution of the United States. To her left, a serpent, the symbol of wisdom, is entwined around a section of a column.	
Lincoln Catafalque	1865		Exhibit Hall, United States Capitol Visitor Center	Wood and Cloth	A rectangular wooden coffin draped with a black cloth.	
Lincoln's Second Inaugural, 1865	1994	Allyn Cox	"Cox Corridors", U.S. Capitol Building	Oil on canvas	At his inaugural on the steps of the newly completed Capitol, Lincoln expressed his hopes for reconstruction of the Union after the Civil War. He urged moderation, humility, and humanity in dealings with the South. Shown in the center of the scene (from left to right) are Vice President Andrew Johnson, President Lincoln, and Chief Justice Salmon P. Chase.	
Louisiana Purchase, 1803	1994	Allyn Cox	"Cox Corridors", U.S. Capitol Building	Oil on canvas	The third signing of the Louisiana Treaty, which occurred in New Orleans, is depicted.	
Lycurgus, relief portrait	1950	C. Paul Jennewein	House Chamber	Marble	A grey marble sideview of Lycurgus. He is looking to the left, and has a beard. Surrounding the circular frame is a laurel wreath. Under the engraving is the text "LYCURGUS".	
Lyndon B. Johnson Room plaque	1964		Room S-211, U.S. Capitol Building	Bronze	A grey-and-gold bronze plaque with the United States seal at top. The plaque reads: "LYNDON BAINES JOHNSON OCCUPIED THIS ROOM FROM JANUARY 7, 1959, TO NOVEMBER 22, 1963; FIRST AS MAJORITY LEADER OF THE UNITED STATES SENATE AND LATER AS VICE PRESIDENT OF THE UNITED STATES. ON NOVEMBER 22, 1963, HE WAS SWORN IN AS PRESIDENT FOLLOWING THE ASSASSINATION OF PRESIDENT JOHN F. KENNEDY".	
Maimonides, relief portrait	1950	Brenda Putnam	House Chamber	Marble	A grey marble sideview of Maimonides. He is looking to the right, and has a beard. Surrounding the circular frame is a laurel wreath. Under the engraving is the text "MAIMONIDES".	
Magna Carta Replica and Display	1976	Louis Osman	Capitol crypt	Glass and Paper	A glass box that holds a replica Magna Carta. Behind the display is window, and an informational plaque is in front of the display.	
Marcus Whitman statue	1953	Avard Fairbanks	National Statuary Hall	Bronze	A brown bronze statue of Marcus Whitman. He is standing on rocks, and is holding a book in his right hand. Engraved in gold on the granite pedestal are the words "MARCUS WHITMAN".	
Maria Sanford statue	1958	Evelyn Raymond	Emancipation Hall, United States Capitol Visitor Center	Bronze	A brown bronze statue of Maria Sanford. She is wearing a dress and has a book in her right hand. Engraved on the pedestal below are the words "MARIA L. SANFORD".	
Martin Luther King Jr. bust	1980	John Wilson	Capitol Rotunda	Bronze	A black bronze statue of Dr. Martin Luther King Jr. He is wearing a suit, and is standing behind a lectern, presumably depicting him during a speech. Rising behind him is a large pillar.	
Masonic Commemorative Cornerstone Plaque	1932		United States Capitol	Marble	A weathered marble plaque. On the plaque is an indistinguishable seal and the words: "LAID MASONICALLY SEPT. 17, 1932 IN COMMEMORATION OF THE LAYING OF THE ORIGINAL CORNERSTONE BY GEORGE WASHINGTON".	
Minton Tiles	1876-1888	Minton, Hollins and Company	United States Capitol	Clay	A floor with several tiles in colorful circular patterns. In the middle of the floor is a depiction of the sun.	
Moses, relief portrait	1950	Jean de Marco	House Chamber	Marble	A grey marble engraving of Moses. He is looking directly forward, and has a menacing look on his face. Surrounding the circular frame is a laurel wreath. Under the engraving is the text "MOSES".	
Mother Joseph statue	1980	Felix W. de Weldon	National Statuary Hall	Bronze	A brown bronze statue of Mother Joseph. She is wearing a dress and bonnet, and is bent down in prayer. On the pedestal are several images, and paragraphs of text.	
Mountains and Clouds	1986	Alexander Calder	Hart Senate Office Building	Steel	A large black steel sculpture rises up from the ground. Behind the sculpture are rows of windows and catwalks, and on the floor are ropes to stop people from touching the statue. The second half of the statue hangs from the ceiling.	
Napoleon I, relief portrait	1950	C. Paul Jennewein	House Chamber	Marble	A grey marble sideview of Napoleon. He is looking to the right, and has a laurel wreath on his head. Surrounding the circular frame is another laurel wreath. Under the engraving is the text "NAPOLEON".	
Nathanael Greene statue	1870	Henry Kirke Brown	United States Capitol	Marble	A white marble statue of Nathanael Greene. He has his right hand on his hip and is wearing a traditional suit. On the pedestal are the words "RHODE ISLAND".	
Naval Gun Crew in the Spanish-American War	1855-1863	Constantino Brumidi	Capitol Rotunda	Plaster	A group of United States Navy sailors in a gun crew are depicted in a naval battle during the Spanish–American War.	
New Dome Symbolizes Union, 1863	1974	Allyn Cox	"Cox Corridors", U.S. Capitol Building	Oil on canvas	In this mural Walter (center, in dark coat and top hat) shows his dome design to President Abraham Lincoln.	
New York, 1765	1974	Allyn Cox	"Cox Corridors", U.S. Capitol Building	Oil on canvas	A painting of a multi-story brick building surrounded by trees. Under the building are garlands with blue ribbons, and directly below the building are the words "NEW YORK, 1765".	
New York, 1785	1974	Allyn Cox	"Cox Corridors", U.S. Capitol Building	Oil on canvas	A painting of a multi-story brick building surrounded by trees and a church. Under the building are garlands with blue ribbons, and directly below the building are the words "NEW YORK, 1785".	
Northern Wilderness	1994	Allyn Cox	"Cox Corridors", U.S. Capitol Building	Oil on canvas	A lone explorer in a canoe enters the picture, symbolically from the east.	
Oglethorpe and the Indians	1855-1863	Filippo Costaggini	Capitol Rotunda	Plaster	James Oglethorpe, who founded the colony of Georgia and became its first governor, is shown making peace on the site of Savannah with the chief of the Muskogee Indians, who presents a buffalo skin decorated with an eagle, symbol of love and protection.	
Old House Chamber, 1838	1974	Allyn Cox	"Cox Corridors", U.S. Capitol Building	Oil on canvas	John Quincy Adams (center, with raised hand) is shown speaking in the chamber; Speaker James K. Polk is seated under the canopy at left.	
Oliver Hazard Perry Morton statue	1900	Charles H. Niehaus	Hall of Columns	Marble	A white marble statue of Oliver Hazard Perry Morton. is left hand is resting on a pillar, and he is wearing a traditional vest and overcoat. Engraved on the pedestal are a wreath, and inside of the wreath are the words "OLIVER MORTON". At the very bottom is the word "INDIANA".	
Papinian, relief portrait	1950	Laura Gardin Fraser	House Chamber	Marble	A grey marble sideview of Papinian. He is looking to the right, and has a laurel wreath on his head. Surrounding the circular frame is another laurel wreath. Under the engraving is the text "PAPINIAN".	
Patrick Anthony McCarran statue	1960	Yolande Jacobson	Hall of Columns	Bronze	A green bronze statue of Patrick Anthony McCarran. He is wearing a judiciary robe, and has a book in his right hand. Engraved on the pedestal are the words "PATRICK A. McCARRAN".	
Peace at the End of the Civil War		Allyn Cox	Capitol Rotunda	Plaster		
Peace Monument	1878	Franklin Simmons, Edward Clark Potter and David Dixon Porter	1st Street and Pennsylvania Avenue NW, U.S. Capitol grounds	Marble	The monument, as seen from its base. Two statues sit atop of it.	
Philadelphia, 1774	1974	Allyn Cox	"Cox Corridors", U.S. Capitol Building	Oil on canvas	A brown brick building surrounded by trees and other building. Below the building are green garlands with blue ribbons, and directly under the building are the words "PHILADELPHIA, 1774".	
Philadelphia, 1775	1974	Allyn Cox	"Cox Corridors", U.S. Capitol Building	Oil on canvas	A yellow brick building surrounded by trees. Below the building are green garlands with blue ribbons, and directly under the building are the words "PHILADELPHIA, 1775".	
Philadelphia, 1790	1974	Allyn Cox	"Cox Corridors", U.S. Capitol Building	Oil on canvas	A yellow-walled room with windows and chairs. Below the painting are green garlands with blue ribbons, and directly under the painting are the words "PHILADELPHIA, 1790".	
Philip Kearny statue	1888	Henry Kirke Brown	Hall of Columns	Bronze	A brown bronze statue of Philip Kearny. He is wearing Confederate officer clothing, and has a cane in his right hand. Engraved on the pedestal are the words "NEW JERSEY".	
Philo T. Farnsworth statue	1990	James R. Avati	United States Capitol Visitor Center	Bronze		
Pierre Charles L'Enfant portrait	1974	Allyn Cox	"Cox Corridors", U.S. Capitol Building	Oil on canvas	A painting depicting a portrait of Pierre Charles L'Enfant. He is wearing a beige suit, and is looking to the right. Under him are green garlands and plants, and directly under him is the text "L'ENFANT".	
Pizarro Going to Peru	Unknown	Constantino Brumidi	Capitol Rotunda	Plaster	Spanish conquistador Francisco Pizarro is depicted leading his horse through the jungle in search of El Dorado, the mythical land of gold, in this representation of the Spanish conquest of the Inca Empire.	
Po'pay statue	2005	Cliff Fragua	United States Capitol Visitor Center	Marble		
Portrait Monument to Lucretia Mott, Elizabeth Cady Stanton and Susan B. Anthony	1920	Adelaide Johnson	Capitol Rotunda	Marble	A portrait of several famous suffragists. Their heads are protruding out of a solid white marble cube, and they have various expressions on their faces.	
POW/MIA Chair of Honor	2017	Desk Manufacturing Company of Philadelphia	Emancipation Hall, United States Capitol Visitor Center	Wood and Leather	A black wood-and-leather chair. On the right is a POW/MIA flag, and on the left is an American flag. Behind the chair is a plaque with unreadable text.	
Preservation of Captain Smith by Pocahontas, 1606, relief sculpture	1820s	Antonio Capellano	West Door, Capitol Rotunda	Sandstone	A sandstone engraving of a man and Native Americans fighting. The Native Americans are on top of the man, and one has a hooked club.	
President's Room Chandelier	1864	Cornelius and Baker	President's Room, U.S. Capitol Building	Bronze	Two photos of a chandelier in black-and-white.	
Princeton, 1783	1974	Allyn Cox	"Cox Corridors", U.S. Capitol Building	Oil on canvas	A large white building with many windows and a white cross crowning its dome. Under the building is a green garland with blue ribbons, and directly under the building are the words "PRINCETON, 1783".	
Progress of Civilization Pediment	1863	Thomas Crawford	Senate wing entrance, U.S. Capitol Building	Marble	The Progress of Civilization is the pediment on the East Front of the U.S. Capitol building's Senate wing. The center figure is America, who stands with the sun at her back and an eagle at her side.	
Quotation from Daniel Webster Plaque		Daniel Webster	United States Capitol	Marble	A grey marble plaque. Under the plaque are leaves, and text on the plaque reads: "RESOURCES OF OUR LAND, CALL FORTH ITS POWERS, BUILD UP ITS INSTITUTIONS, PROMOTE ALL ITS GREAT INTERESTS AND SEE WHETHER WE ALSO IN OUR DAY AND GENERATION MAY NOT PERFORM SOMETHING WORTHY TO BE REMEMBERED".	
Raoul Wallenberg bust	1995	Miri Margolin	Emancipation Hall, United States Capitol Visitor Center	Bronze	A brown bronze bust of Raoul Wallenberg. He is wearing a suit and tie. On the granite pedestal is a black-and-gold plaque.	
René Robert Cavelier Sieur de La Salle Relief Sculpture	1960	Antonio Capellano and Enrico Causici	Capitol Rotunda, above Embarkation of the Pilgrims	Sandstone	A sandstone engraving in a wall. In the middle of the engraving is a sideview of René Robert Cavelier Sieur de La Salle, who is facing the left. Around him are plants that spiral out to his left and right.	
Revolutionary War Door	1905	Thomas Crawford	East House Portico, U.S. Capitol Building	Bronze	A brown bronze door engraved with two stars at the top and several other dioramas depicting moments in American history.	
Rhytons	1964	W.H. Livingston Sr.	Rayburn House Office Building	Marble	A white marble winged horse, looking down and shown in the middle of a prance. On the right is the dome of the Capitol, out of focus.	
Richard Stockton statue	1888	Henry Kirke Brown	Capitol crypt	Marble	A white marble statue of Richard Stockton. He is wearing a vest and buckled shoes, and in his left hand is a book. On the pedestal are the words "NEW JERSEY".	
Robert A. Taft Memorial and Carillon	1959	Douglas W. Orr	U.S. Capitol grounds	Bronze and Marble	A beige bronze-and-marble Tower. At the top of the tower are vertical cutouts, and a large clock is visible. On the bottom are stairs, and a statue of an unknown person, likely Robert A. Taft. The tower and statue are surrounded by trees.	
Robert Fulton statue	1889	Howard Roberts	National Statuary Hall	Marble	A white marble statue of Robert Fulton. He is sitting down, and is reading something on a piece of paper. On the granite pedestal are the words "ROBERT FULTON".	
Robert Joseph Pothier, relief portrait	1950	Joseph Kiselewski	House Chamber	Marble	A grey marble sideview of Robert Joseph Pothier. He is looking to the left, and has judiciary garments on. Surrounding the circular frame is a laurel wreath. Under the engraving is the text "POTHIER".	
Robert R. Livingston statue	1875	Erastus Dow Palmer	Capitol crypt	Bronze	A brown bronze statue of Robert R. Livingston. He is wearing a robe, and has a pamphlet in his right hand. On the pedestal are the words "NEW YORK".	
Roger Sherman statue	1872	Chauncey B. Ives	Capitol crypt	Marble	A white marble statue of Roger Sherman. He is wearing a robe with buckled shoes and is pointing at something. He has a blank expression on his face, and engraved on the pedestal is the word "CONNECTICUT".	
Roger Williams statue	1872	Franklin Simmons	Hall of Columns	Marble	A white marble statue of Roger Williams. He is holding a book in his left hand and is looking forward and slightly up. Engraved on the pedestal are the words "RHODE ISLAND".	
Ronald Reagan statue	2009	Chas Fagan	Capitol Rotunda	Bronze		
Rosa Parks statue	2013	Daub and Firmin Studio	National Statuary Hall	Bronze		
Rotunda During Civil War, 1862	1974	Allyn Cox	"Cox Corridors", U.S. Capitol Building	Oil on canvas	A painting that depicts the Rotunda during the Civil War, during the six-week period that it was used as a hospital. A woman is sitting next to injured soldiers, reading a book.	
Rotunda east door clock	1950	Lee Lawrie	Capitol Rotunda	Bronze		
Saint Louis, relief portrait	1950	Jean de Marco	House Chamber	Marble	A grey marble sideview of Saint Louis. He is looking to the left, and is wearing a crown. Surrounding the circular frame is a laurel wreath. Under the engraving is the text "ST. LOUIS".	
Sakakawea statue	2003	Leonard Crunelle	United States Capitol Visitor Center	Bronze	A brown bronze statue of Sakakawea. She is wearing a robe and is holding a baby, and has her eyes closed. On a plaque located on the granite pedestal are the words "NORTH DAKOTA, SAKAKAWEA, 1804-1806".	
Sam Houston statue	1905	Elisabet Ney	National Statuary Hall	Marble	A white marble statue of Sam Houston. He is wearing a suit with boots, and engraved on the granite pedestal is the word "TEXAS".	
Samuel Adams statue	1876	Anne Whitney	Capitol crypt	Marble		
Samuel Jordan Kirkwood statue	1913	Vinnie Ream	Hall of Columns	Bronze	A yellow bronze statue of Samuel Jordan Kirkwood. He is wearing a vest and overcoat, and has his right hand slightly outstretched. On the pedestal are the words "KIRKWOOD, IOWA".	
Sandwich Islands	1994	Allyn Cox	"Cox Corridors", U.S. Capitol Building	Oil on canvas	A map shows the islands now called Hawaii, which were annexed in 1898; an island native carries fruit in an out-rigger canoe with a cloth sail.	
Sarah Winnemucca statue	2005	Benjamin Victor	Emancipation Hall, United States Capitol Visitor Center	Bronze		
Sequoyah statue	1917	Vinnie Ream and G. Julian Zolnay	National Statuary Hall	Bronze	A brown bronze statue of Sequoya. He is wearing a robe, and has a book in his left hand. Engraved in gold on the granite pedestal is the word "OKLAHOMA".	
Sharecroppers	1994	Allyn Cox	"Cox Corridors", U.S. Capitol Building	Oil on canvas	A couple picks cotton in the south with their cabin behind them and the plantation house in the distance.	
Signing of the Constitution	1940	Howard Chandler Christy	House Wing, East Stairway, U.S. Capitol Building	Oil on canvas	George Washington presiding the Philadelphia Convention. For more detailed information, see the article about the work, linked in blue at its title.	
Simon de Montfort, relief portrait	1950	Gaetano Cecere	House Chamber	Marble	A grey marble sideview of Saint Louis. He is looking to the right, and has a beard. Surrounding the circular frame is a laurel wreath. Under the engraving is the text "de MONTFORT".	
Sir Walter Raleigh Relief Sculpture		Francisco Iardella	Capitol Rotunda, above Surrender of Lord Cornwallis	Sandstone	A sandstone engraving in a wall. In the middle of the engraving is a sideview of Sir Walter Raleigh, who is facing the left. Around him are plants that spiral out to his left and right.	
Sir William Blackstone, relief portrait	1950	Thomas Hudson Jones	House Chamber	Marble	A grey marble sideview of Sir William Blackstone. He is looking to the right, and is wearing a traditional judiciary wig. Surrounding the circular frame is a laurel wreath. Under the engraving is the text "BLACKSTONE".	
Sir Winston Churchill bust	2013	Oscar Nemon	Small House Rotunda	Bronze	A brown bronze bust of Sir Winston Churchill. e has a smug look on his face, and is looking forward. On the white marble pedestal are the words "WINSTON CHURCHILL, 1874-1965, STATESMAN, DEFENDER OF FREEDOM, HONORARY U.S. CITIZEN".	
Slave Labor Commemorative Marker	2012	Congressional Slave Labor Task Force Working Group	Emancipation Hall, United States Capitol Visitor Center	Sandstone	An enclosed glass box with a sandstone block on display. Behind the block is a black-and-gold plaque, with unreadable text.	
Small Senate Rotunda Chandelier	1965	Benjamin Henry Latrobe	Small Senate Rotunda	Bronze and Crystal	A colorful domed ceiling with a semi-circular chandelier hanging from its highest point.	
Sod House	1994	Allyn Cox	"Cox Corridors", U.S. Capitol Building	Oil on canvas	A typical prairie home is shown with a barbed wire fence, which represents the settlement of the great open plains.	
Sojourner Truth bust	2009	Artis Lane	Emancipation Hall, United States Capitol Visitor Center	Bronze	A brown bronze bust of Sojourner Truth. She is wearing a bonnet, and is smiling. Her arms are cut off directly below the shoulders.	
Solon, relief portrait	1950	Brenda Putnam	House Chamber	Marble	A grey marble sideview of Solon. He is looking to the right, and has a beard. Surrounding the circular frame is a laurel wreath. Under the engraving is the text "SOLON".	
Spanish Mission	1994	Allyn Cox	"Cox Corridors", U.S. Capitol Building	Oil on canvas	A converted Native American kneels in prayer under the guidance of a monk in front of the El Carmelo mission.	
Stalking Deer	1994	Allyn Cox	"Cox Corridors", U.S. Capitol Building	Oil on canvas	A member of a hunting-gathering tribe is shown in a northern forest with pine and fur trees.	
Statue of Freedom	1863	Thomas Crawford	Capitol Dome	Bronze	A large green bronze statue of a woman with a robe. She is holding several things, and below her are the words "E PLURIBUS UNUM".	
Steam Powered Amphibious Boat, 1804	1974	Allyn Cox	"Cox Corridors", U.S. Capitol Building	Oil on canvas	The steamboat on the Platte River symbolizes the breakthrough in water travel made possible by Evans's invention. Right: The world's first railroad suspension bridge (designed by John Roebling, who would later create the Brooklyn Bridge), symbolizing steam-powered land travel, spans the Niagara River near Niagara Falls.	
Stephen Austin statue	1905	Elisabet Ney	Hall of Columns	Marble	A white marble statue of Stephen Austin. He has a rifle in his left hand, and is wearing a casual overcoat and boots. Engraved on the granite pedestal is the word "TEXAS".	
Suleiman, relief portrait	1950	Joseph Kiselewski	House Chamber	Marble	A grey marble sideview of Suleiman. He is looking to the right, and is wearing a turban. Surrounding the circular frame is a laurel wreath. Under the engraving is the text "SULEIMAN".	
Surrender of Cornwallis	1855-1863	Filippo Costaggini	Capitol Rotunda	Plaster	Depiction of George Washington on horseback receiving the ceremonial sword of surrender from Charles O'Hara, who represented Lord Cornwallis after the final British defeat at the Battle of Yorktown. In reality, it is thought that Washington declined O'Hara's sword because according to the custom of the time it would only be proper for Washington to receive the sword from Cornwallis himself; Major General Benjamin Lincoln instead accepted the sword.	
Surrender of General Burgoyne	1821	John Trumbull	Capitol Rotunda	Oil on canvas	A painting of soldiers surrounding a man. For more information, see the article on the work.	
Surrender of Lord Cornwallis	1819-1820	John Trumbull	Capitol Rotunda	Oil on canvas	A painting of two rows of soldiers standing against each other, with an officer on horseback in the center. For more information, see the article on the work.	
Telegraph Centennial Plaque	1944	Lee Lawrie	Center Section, First Floor, Old Supreme Court Chamber, U.S. Capitol Building	Bronze	A brown bronze plaque with the face of Samuel L. Morse engraved into it. The text on the plaque reads: "WHAT HATH GOD WROUGHT! 1791 1872 SAMUEL F.B. MORSE THE INVENTOR ON MAY 24 1844 IN THE OLD SUPREME COURT ROOM - NOW THE LAW LIBRARY IN THE CAPITOL - SENT THE ABOVE MESSAGE TO BALTIMORE MARYLAND BY THE FIRST ELECTRO-MAGNETIC TELEGRAPH INSTRUMENT ON MAY 24 1944 THE SEVENTY-EIGHTH CONGRESS OF THE UNITED-STATES -SECOND SESSION - DEDICATED THIS MEMORIAL TO THE HUMILITY AND VISION WHICH ENABLED THIS INVENTOR TO BE THE CONVEYOR OF THIS UNIVERSAL BLESSING TO MANKIND".	
Terra Incognita	1974-1994	Allyn Cox	"Cox Corridors", U.S. Capitol Building	Oil on canvas	The map is inscribed "Terra Incognita" (Latin for "Unknown Territory"). On it, the names of the original Native American tribes of the eastern coast of North America appear in the tribes' approximate geographic locations. This first map shows the edge of the continent before the arrival of Columbus, whose three ships are depicted crossing the ocean.	
The Albany Congress, 1754	1974-1994	Allyn Cox	"Cox Corridors", U.S. Capitol Building	Oil on canvas	The mural depicts severak delegates (from left to right): William Franklin and his father, Benjamin (Pennsylvania); Governor Thomas Hutchinson (Massachusetts); Governor William Delancey (New York); Sir William Johnson (Massachusetts); Colonel Benjamin Tasker (Maryland).	
The Birth of Aviation	1974-1994	Allyn Cox	Capitol Rotunda	Plaster	This scene depicts the Wright brothers' first flight at Kitty Hawk in 1903. The Wright Flyer is shown just off the ground, with Orville Wright in the plane and Wilbur Wright running alongside to steady the wing. To the left are Leonardo da Vinci, Samuel Pierpont Langley, and Octave Chanute, other aviation pioneers, holding models of other early flying machines. An eagle holds an olive branch in the bottom right.	
The Constitutional Convention, 1787	1974-1994	Allyn Cox	"Cox Corridors", U.S. Capitol Building	Oil on canvas	This mural shows delegates meeting in Benjamin Franklin's garden (from left to right): Alexander Hamilton, James Wilson, James Madison, and Benjamin Franklin.	
The Declaration of Independence, 1776	1974-1994	Allyn Cox	"Cox Corridors", U.S. Capitol Building	Oil on canvas	The mural depicts (from left to right) Benjamin Franklin, Roger Sherman, Thomas Jefferson, Robert Livingston, and John Adams. On the wall in the background is a portrait of English philosopher John Locke.	
The First Continental Congress, 1774	1974-1994	Allyn Cox	"Cox Corridors", U.S. Capitol Building	Oil on canvas	The mural depicts an oration by Patrick Henry in Carpenters' Hall.	
The First Federal Congress, 1789	1974-1994	Allyn Cox	"Cox Corridors", U.S. Capitol Building	Oil on canvas	Shown in the mural are (from left to right) James Madison (standing), speaker Frederick Muhlenberg (seated), Elbridge Gerry (standing, foreground), and Fisher Ames (standing, rear).	
The First Four Settlements in America	1974-1994	Allyn Cox	"Cox Corridors", U.S. Capitol Building	Oil on canvas	The map shows the first four settlements in America, from St. Augustine (1565) to Plymouth (1620).	
The First Thirteen Colonies	1994	Allyn Cox	"Cox Corridors", U.S. Capitol Building	Oil on canvas	The map shows the first thirteen colonies and the year in which each entered the Union. The original Northwest territories, the Connecticut Reserve, and Spanish and West Florida are also shown. Beside the motto "Join or Die" is a snake segmented into thirteen parts, each labeled with the abbreviation of a state, copied from a colonial block print.	
The Library of Congress in the Capitol, 1800-1897	1994	Allyn Cox	"Cox Corridors", U.S. Capitol Building	Oil on canvas	This mural depicts the library in the Capitol in 1890, when it had grown to occupy almost the entire west central section of the building. Librarian of Congress Ainsworth Spofford is shown seated at the left.	
The Mayflower Compact, 1620	1974-1994	Allyn Cox	"Cox Corridors", U.S. Capitol Building	Oil on canvas	Pilgrim leader William Brewster is shown signing the document; John Standish, the colony's military leader, stands at left.	
The Monroe Doctrine, 1823	1994	Allyn Cox	"Cox Corridors", U.S. Capitol Building	Oil on canvas	This mural depicts a discussion among the president and members of his cabinet; from left to right are President James Monroe, Secretary of State John Quincy Adams, Attorney General William Wirt, Secretary of War John Calhoun, and Secretary of the Navy Samuel L. Southard.	
The Smithsonian Institution, 1855	1974-1994	Allyn Cox	"Cox Corridors", U.S. Capitol Building	Oil on canvas	This mural shows the Smithsonian's red sandstone "castle," which opened in 1855.	
Theodore Roosevelt, circa 1904	1974-1994	Allyn Cox	"Cox Corridors", U.S. Capitol Building	Oil on canvas	The mural shows Roosevelt giving one of his characteristically enthusiastic speeches. Directly below him, journalist H.L. Mencken takes notes.	
Thomas Crawford portrait	1974	Allyn Cox	"Cox Corridors", U.S. Capitol Building	Oil on canvas	A painting depicting a portrait of Thomas Crawford. He is wearing a beige suit with a blue bowtie, and is looking to the right. Under him are green garlands and plants, and directly under him is the text "CRAWFORD".	
Thomas Edison statue	2016	Alan Cottrill	National Statuary Hall	Bronze		
Thomas Jefferson statue	1834	Pierre-Jean David d'Angers	Capitol Rotunda	Bronze	A brown bronze statue of Thomas Jefferson. He is wearing a casual overcoat and buckled shoes, and holds what appears to be a document in his left hand. Engraved on the white marble pedestal is the word "JEFFERSON".	
Thomas Jefferson, relief portrait	1950	C. Paul Jennewein	House Chamber	Marble	A grey marble sideview of Thomas Jefferson. He is looking to the right, and is smiling. Surrounding the circular frame is a laurel wreath. Under the engraving is the text "JEFFERSON".	
Thomas U. Walter portrait	1974	Allyn Cox	"Cox Corridors", U.S. Capitol Building	Oil on canvas	A painting depicting a portrait of Thomas U. Walter. He is wearing a black suit with a blue bowtie, and is looking forward. Under him are green garlands and plants, and directly under him is the text "WALTER".	
Timucuan Village	1994	Allyn Cox	"Cox Corridors", U.S. Capitol Building	Oil on canvas	Three Native Americans of northern Florida's Timucuan tribe are depicted near their village.	
Tobacco column capitals		Francisco Iardella and Benjamin H. Latrobe	Small Senate Rotunda, U.S. Capitol Building	Sandstone	A row of white sandstone pillars.	
Trenton, 1784	1974	Allyn Cox	"Cox Corridors", U.S. Capitol Building	Oil on canvas	A brown brick building surrounded by trees. Below the building are green garlands with blue ribbons, and directly below the building is the text "TRENTON, 1784".	
Tribonian, relief portrait	1950	Brenda Putnam	House Chamber	Marble	A grey marble sideview of Tribonian. He is looking to the left, and is smiling. Surrounding the circular frame is a laurel wreath. Under the engraving is the text "TRIBONIAN".	
Ulysses S. Grant Memorial	1922	Henry Merwin Shrady	Union Square, U.S. Capitol grounds	Bronze and Marble	A brown bronze statue of Ulysses S. Grant on horseback. The statue sits atop a marble pedestal. For more detailed information, see the article on the work.	
Ulysses S. Grant statue	1899	Franklin Simmons	Capitol Rotunda	Marble	A white marble statue of Ulysses S. Grant. He is wearing high boots and a trenchcoat, and has a sword in his left hand. On the pedestal is a black engraving of a medal.	
Wade Hampton statue	1929	Frederic W. Ruckstull	United States Capitol Visitor Center	Marble	A white marble statue of Wade Hampton. He is wearing a vest and overcoat, and his left hand is resting on a pillar. The pedestal is made of the same material.	
War and Peace	1835	Luigi Persico	East Front, Central U.S. Capitol Building	Marble	A white marble statue of a robed figure inside of an arch, with her right hand up to her heart. A white marble statue of a Greek warrior in traditional Greek clothing. He is wearing a helmet and has a shield behind his back.	
Washington's Farewell Address, 1796	1974-1994	Allyn Cox	"Cox Corridors", U.S. Capitol Building	Oil on canvas	George Washington at his desk with Alexander Hamilton.	
Washington's Inauguration, 1789	1974-1994	Allyn Cox	"Cox Corridors", U.S. Capitol Building	Oil on canvas	The mural depicts (from left to right) Robert R. Livingston, chancellor of the state of New York, administering the oath; Secretary of the Senate Samuel Otis holding the Bible; George Washington, with his hand upraised; and Vice President John Adams.	
Washington, 1800	1974	Allyn Cox	"Cox Corridors", U.S. Capitol Building	Oil on canvas	A white multi-story building with several windows. Below the building are green garlands, and directly below is the text "WASHINGTON, 1800".	
Washington, 1814	1974	Allyn Cox	"Cox Corridors", U.S. Capitol Building	Oil on canvas	A yellow multi-story building. Below the building are green garlands, and directly below is the text "WASHINGTON, 1814".	
Washington, 1815	1974	Allyn Cox	"Cox Corridors", U.S. Capitol Building	Oil on canvas	A brick multi-story building surrounded by trees. Below the building are green garlands, and directly below is the text "WASHINGTON, 1815".	
Washington, 1829	1974	Allyn Cox	"Cox Corridors", U.S. Capitol Building	Oil on canvas	The U.S. Capitol building surrounded by trees. Below the building are green garlands, and directly below is the text "WASHINGTON, 1829".	
Washington, 1867	1974	Allyn Cox	"Cox Corridors", U.S. Capitol Building	Oil on canvas	The U.S. Capitol building surrounded by trees. Below the building are green garlands, and directly below is the text "WASHINGTON, 1867".	
Weaving	1994	Allyn Cox	"Cox Corridors", U.S. Capitol Building	Oil on canvas	A mural depicting weaving via a loom is shown as a family operation, with children carding the wool, a young woman spinning it, and an older woman operating a loom.	
Westward the Course of Empire Takes Its Way	1861	Emanuel Leutze	House Wing, West Stairway, U.S. Capitol Building	Mineral painting	A painting showing a battle, with men piled atop one another. For more detailed information, see the article on the work.	
Will Rogers statue	1939	Jo Davidson	House connecting corridor, 2nd floor, U.S. Capitol Building	Bronze	A brown bronze statue of Will Rogers. He is looking down, and has both of his hands in his pockets. On the grey pedestal are the words "WILL ROGERS, OKLAHOMA".	
Willa Cather statue	2023	Littleton Alston	United States Capitol Visitor Center	Bronze		
William Edgar Borah statue	1947	Bryant Baker	United States Capitol Visitor Center	Bronze	A brown bronze statue of William Edgar Borah. He has a book in his left hand and is wearing a casual suit. On the granite pedestal are the words "WILLIAM E. BORAH, IDAHO".	
William Henry Harrison Beadle statue	1938	H. Daniel Webster	National Statuary Hall	Bronze	A green bronze statue of William Henry Harrison Beadle. He is resting is left hand on a lectern, and is wearing an overcoat. The pedestal that the statue sits atop is made of granite.	
William King statue	1878	Franklin Simmons	House connecting corridor, 2nd floor, U.S. Capitol Building	Marble	A white marble statue of William King. He is wearing a long robe and boots, and is looking slightly upward with his right hand on his chest. On the pedestal are the words "WILLIAM KING, MAINE".	
William Penn and the Indians	1855-1863	Constantino Brumidi	Capitol Rotunda	Plaster	Quaker leader and Province of Pennsylvania founder William Penn is depicted with Lenape (Delaware) Native Americans under the elm tree at Shackamaxon.	
William Penn's Treaty with the Indians, 1682, relief sculpture	1820s	Nicholas Gevelot	Capitol Rotunda, North Door	Sandstone	A grey sandstone engraving of two Native Americans in conversation with a settler. Above them hangs a tree branch.	
Women's Suffrage Parade, 1917	1974-1994	Allyn Cox	"Cox Corridors", U.S. Capitol Building	Oil on canvas	This mural by Allyn Cox at the U.S. Capital building depicts a 1917 suffrage parade in New York. The parade is led Anna Howard Shaw (in black cap and gown) and Carrie Chapman Catt, president of the National American Woman Suffrage Association. Observing at the far left is Jeanette Rankin of Montana, the first woman elected to the House of Representatives, and at the far right, Joseph H. Rainey of South Carolina, the first African American elected to the House of Representatives.	
York, 1777	1974	Allyn Cox	"Cox Corridors", U.S. Capitol Building	Oil on canvas	After leaving Baltimore the Congress met briefly in Philadelphia but soon moved to York, Pennsylvania, where it met for nine months in the old Court House. The building in the center of the image is the Court House, and under it is a green garland with blue ribbons. Surrounding the court are several smaller buildings.	
Yorktown, 1781	1994	Allyn Cox	"Cox Corridors", U.S. Capitol Building	Oil on canvas	At the end of the Revolutionary War, the British are shown laying down their arms against a symbolic sunset.	
Zebulon Vance statue	1916	Gutzon Borglum	National Statuary Hall	Bronze	A brown bronze statue of Zebulon Vance. e is looking to the right, and is wearing boots, an overcoat, and a cape. On the pedestal which the statue sits atop of are the words "VANCE".	

== House of Representatives portraits ==
Portraits in the House of Representatives collection (A-J)
Subject	Image	Date	Artist	Accession number	Type	Ref.
Abraham Lincoln		2004	Ned Bittinger	2004.099.000	Painting	
Al Ullman		1977	Victor Lallier	2002.008.007	Painting	
Al Ullman		1978	Terry Rodgers	2002.021.008	Painting	
Albert Thomas		1965	Victor Lallier	2017.125.000	Painting	
Ambrose Jerome Kennedy		1951	S. Rosen	2023.062.000	Painting	
Andrew Stevenson		1911	Spencer Baird Nichols	2005.016.011	Painting	
Augustus Hawkins		1990	Joseph Maniscalco	2002.020.004	Painting	
Barney Frank		2013	Jon R. Friedman	2013.079.000	Painting	
Bart Gordon		2010	Paul Benney	2010.041.000	Painting	
Beshekee		1858	Joseph Lassalle	2006.169.000	Bust	
Benjamin Gilman		1999	Laurel Stern Boeck	2002.010.011	Painting	
Brent Spence		1962	Samuel C. Gholson	2002.013.007	Painting	
Brock Adams		1977	Victor Lallier	2002.008.002	Painting	
Carl Albert		2002	Paul Moore	2004.005.000	Painting	
Carl Albert		1973	Charles Banks Wilson	2005.016.046	Painting	
Carl D. Perkins		1994	Sam McKinney	2002.020.001	Painting	
Carl Vinson		1943	Lawrence Powers	2002.007.004	Painting	
Charles Halleck		1974	William Sabol	2005.153.000	Painting	
Charles A. Wolverton		1959	Ceasare Ricciardi	2004.079.002	Painting	
Charles A. Buckley		1960	Oscar Gruber	2002.022.006	Painting	
Charles A. Eaton		1947-1949	Alfred Jonniaux	2002.010.005	Painting	
Charles Rangel		2008	Simmie Knox	2011.092.000	Painting	
Charles Carroll of Carrollton		1830	Chester Charles Harding	2005.022.000	Painting	
Christopher Cox		2014	Steven Polson	2014.160.000	Painting	
Charles F. Crisp		1894	Robert Cutler Hinckley	2005.016.033	Painting	
Charlie Rose		2001	Jeffrey Martin	2003.001.003	Painting	
Jerry Lewis		2009	Michael Del Priore	2009.058.000	Painting	
Charles M. Price		1976	Robert Templeton	2002.007.008	Painting	
Charles P. Roberts		1997	Michael Del Priore	2002.009.001	Painting	
Charles W. Young		2003	Michael Del Priore	2003.016.000	Painting	
Chester Holifield		1974	Lloyd Embry	2002.011.003	Painting	
Christopher H. Smith		2013	Michael Del Priore	2014.027.000	Painting	
Clarence Cannon		1967	Irving Resnikoff (Note: Attributed to Reskinoff, but produced by the Studio of CJ Fox.)	2002.006.012	Painting	
Claude Pepper		1985	Marshall Bouldin III	2002.017.002	Painting	
Claude Kitchin		1919-1920	Freeman Thorp	2002.021.015	Painting	
Claude Kitchin		1930-1931	Edgardo Simone	2005.141.001	Bust	
Clement Zablocki		1979	Robert Schuenke	2002.010.013	Painting	
Clifford Hope		1956	Mabel Pugh	2002.009.005	Painting	
Collin Peterson		2011	Leslie W. Bowman	2011.031.000	Painting	
Lindy Boggs		2004	Ned Bittinger	2004.058.000	Painting	
Dalip Singh Saund		2007	Jon R. Friedman	2007.230.000	Painting	
Daniel A. Reed		1953-1954	Jean Spencer	2002.021.010	Painting	
Dan Rostenkowski		1983	Robert D. Bentley	2002.021.005	Painting	
Danny Burton		2000	Everett Kinstler	2002.011.002	Painting	
Dante Fascell		1987	Robert Bruce Williams	2002.010.012	Painting	
Darrell Issa		2014	Andy Thomas	2014.153.000	Painting	
David Bremner Henderson		1903	Freeman Thorp	2005.016.034	Painting	
David Lee Camp		2014	Leslie W. Bowman	2014.098.000	Painting	
Phil Roe		2021	Ying-He Liu	2021.096.000	Painting	
Death Whoop (Note: Title of work, name of subject is not known.)		1868	Seth Eastman	2004.040.002	Painting	
Dewey Short		1956	Percy A. Leason	2002.007.002	Painting	
Diane Black		2018	Ying-He Liu	2018.206.000	Painting	
Don Fuqua		1983	Jean Pilk	2002.018.001	Painting	
Donald Manzullo		2010	Vincent Chiaramonte	2010.042.000	Painting	
Donald Edwin Young		1996	Charlen Satrom	2002.015.004	Painting	
Donald Edwin Young		2002	Charlen Satrom	2002.022.004	Painting	
Duncan Lee Hunter		2009	Mark Martensen	2009.082.000	Painting	
E.G. Shuster		1996	Everett Kinstler	2002.022.009	Painting	
Eddie Bernice Johnson		2022	Ying-He Liu	2022.112.000	Painting	
Edith Nourse Rogers		1950	Howard Christy	2002.019.007	Painting	
Edolphus Towns		2011	Vincent Chiaramonte	2011.042.000	Painting	
Edward Garmatz		1968	Irving Resnikoff	2002.015.007	Painting	
Edward Royce		2018	Stephen Craighead	2018.203.000	Painting	
Edward Thomas Taylor		1939	John C. Johansen	2002.006.011	Painting	
Eligio de la Garza		1996	Jena Rawley-Whitaker	2007.105.000	Painting	
Elijah Cummings		2021	Jerrell Gibbs	2022.004.000	Painting	
Emanuel Celler		1963	Joseph Margulies	2002.012.005	Painting	
Espiritu de la Ternura (Note: Title of work, was gifted to the House of Representatives by the Republic of Argentina. Subject is not known.)		1991	Antonio Sarelli	2003.003.000	Painting	
Everett Dirksen		1960	Gisbert Palmié	2011.003.000	Painting	
Felix Hébert		1971	John Parker	2002.007.009	Painting	
Fernand Joseph St. Germain		1985	Everett Kinstler	2002.013.005	Painting	
Florence Prag Kahn		2009	Andre White	2009.005.000	Painting	
Floyd Spence		2000	Michael Del Priore	2002.007.005	Painting	
Frank D. Lucas		2015	Robert Alexander Anderson	2015.104.000	Painting	
Frank Sensenbrenner		2002	George Pollard	2002.012.006	Painting	
Frederick Muhlenberg		1881	Samuel B. Waugh	2005.016.001	Painting	
Frederick H. Gillett		1920	Edmund Tarbell	2005.016.037	Painting	
Frederick S. Upton		2017	Charles Pompilius	2017.068.000	Painting	
Galusha Grow		1891	William Greaves	2005.016.024	Painting	
George Dondero		1956	Dorothy Drew	2002.022.003	Painting	
George Edward Brown		1998	George Pollard and Jim Pollard	2002.018.005	Painting	
George H. Mahon		1974	Irving Resnikoff	2002.006.001	Painting	
George H. Mahon		1960	Errett Scrivner	2005.216.001	Painting	
George H. Fallon		1965-1970	Irving Resnikoff	2002.022.005	Painting	
George Miller		2000	Paul Leveille	2002.015.002	Painting	
George Miller		2014	John Boyd Martin	2014.069.000	Painting	
George P. Miller		1965	Victor Lallier	2002.018.002	Painting	
George S. Graham		1917	Richard Partington	2002.012.004	Painting	
George Washington		1834	John Vanderlyn (Note: after Gilbert Charles Stuart.)	2005.017.000	Painting	
George Washington		1805-1818	Unknown	2006.170.000	Painting	
George Washington		1932	Unknown (Note: after Joseph Nollekens.)	2003.010.001	Bust	
Gerald Solomon		1999	Michael Del Priore	2002.017.003	Painting	
Gilbert du Motier		1823	Ary Scheffer	2005.018.000	Painting	
Gillespie Montgomery		1982	Tom Nielsen	2002.019.003	Painting	
Glenn M. Anderson		1989	Tom Nielsen	2002.022.011	Painting	
Greg Walden		2020	Jon R. Friedman	2021.008.000	Painting	
Gunning Bedford Jr.		1785-1795	Charles Peale	2005.020.000	Painting	
Hampton Fulmer		1961	Dalton Shourds	2002.009.003	Painting	
Harley Staggers		1976	Irving Resnikoff	2002.016.004	Painting	
Harold D. Rogers		2016	Leslie W. Bowman	2016.166.000	Painting	
Harold D. Cooley		1954	Mabel Pugh	2002.009.006	Painting	
Harold Knutson		1955	Thomas Edgar Stephens	2002.021.006	Painting	
Harold T. Johnson		1981	Robert Bruce Williams	2002.022.013	Painting	
Hatton Sumners		1946	Boris B. Gordon	2008.004.000	Painting	
Henry Waxman		2015	Jon R. Friedman	2015.120.000	Painting	
Henry Waxman		2015	Jon R. Friedman	2015.119.000	Painting	
Henry B. González		1997	Jesse Trevino	2002.013.001	Painting	
Henry Steagall		1942	Howard Christy	2002.013.006	Painting	
Henry Clay		1852	Giuseppe Fagnani	2005.016.007	Painting	
Henry Clay		1843	John Neagle	2006.172.000	Painting	
Henry D. Flood		1928	Marion C. Hartman	2002.010.004	Painting	
Henry J. Hyde		1998	Michael Del Priore	2002.012.002	Painting	
Henry J. Hyde		2003	Michael Del Priore	2003.020.000	Painting	
Henry Reuss		1981	Robert Hyndman	2002.013.004	Painting	
Henry Rainey		1935	Howard Christy	2005.016.040	Painting	
Herbert Bonner		1956	Mabel Pugh	2002.015.008	Painting	
Herbert R. Roberts		1976	Robert Bruce Williams	2002.019.002	Painting	
Howard McKeon		2010	Dean Paules	2010.040.000	Painting	
Howard McKeon		2014	Bradley Stevens	2014.099.000	Painting	
Howard W. Smith		1961	Victor Lallier	2002.017.004	Painting	
Howell Cobb		1912	Lucy May Stanton	2005.016.019	Painting	
Ileana Ros-Lehtinen		2015	Bryan Drury	2015.121.000	Painting	
Isaac Darlington		1806	Jacob Eichholtz	2004.090.002	Painting	
Isaac Skelton		2012	Gavin Glakas	2012.008.000	Painting	
Jack B. Brooks		1987	Marshall Bouldin III	2002.011.001	Painting	
Jack B. Brooks		1997	Jason Bouldin	2002.012.003	Painting	
James Garfield		1881	Cornelia Fassett	2002.006.006	Painting	
James A. Leach		2002	Michael D. Roberts	2002.013.002	Painting	
James Tawney		1911	Freeman Thorp	2002.006.007	Painting	
James A. Nussle		2007	Clint Hansen	2007.104.000	Painting	
James A. Haley		1976	Thornton Utz	2002.015.003	Painting	
James Beauchamp Clark		1919	Boris B. Gordon	2005.016.036	Painting	
James Beauchamp Clark		1918	Moses Dykaar	2005.026.000	Bust	
James C. Wright		1991	Marshall Bouldin III	2005.016.048	Painting	
James Blaine		1905	Freeman Thorp	2005.016.027	Painting	
James J. Howard		1984	Keith Mueller	2002.022.014	Painting	
James Polk		1911	Rebecca Polk	2005.016.013	Painting	
James L. Orr		1911	Esther Edmonds	2005.016.022	Painting	
James Oberstar		2008	Leslie W. Bowman	2008.022.000	Painting	
James Madison		2002	Bradley Stevens	2002.048.000	Painting	
James Talent		2001	Dean Paules	2002.014.001	Painting	
James Buchanan		1946	Seymour Stone	2002.006.015	Painting	
James P. Richards		1958	Charles C. Tucker	2002.010.008	Painting	
James Robert Jones		1985	Brummett Echohawk	2002.008.004	Painting	
James Robert Mann		1925	Herbert Adams	2005.141.003	Bust	
James V. Hansen		2002	Michael Del Priore	2002.015.011	Painting	
James W. Collier		1933	Boris B. Gordon	2002.021.009	Painting	
James William Good		1921	John C. Johansen	2002.006.018	Painting	
Jamie Whitten		1983	Marshall Bouldin III	2002.006.003	Painting	
Jeannette Rankin		2004	Sharon Sprung	2004.096.000	Painting	
Jeb Hensarling		2018	Jon R. Friedman	2018.204.000	Painting	
Jeff B. Miller		2017	Jeffrey Bass	2017.076.000	Painting	
Jere Cooper		1956	Boris B. Gordon	2002.021.007	Painting	
Joe L. Barton		2008	Laurel Stern Boeck	2008.007.000	Painting	
John Boehner		2006	Michael Del Priore	2006.105.000	Painting	
John Boehner		2019	Ron Sherr	2019.225.000	Painting	
John Blatnik		1974	William F. Draper	2002.022.007	Painting	
John Bell		1911	Willie Newman	2005.016.012	Painting	
John Linthicum		1932	Thomas C. Corner	2002.010.006	Painting	
John Conyers Jr.		2006	Simmie Knox	2006.193.000	Painting	
John Conyers Jr.		2015	Simmie Knox	2015.008.000	Painting	
John Dingell		1981	Jean Pilk	2002.016.003	Painting	
John Hastert		2008	Laurel Stern Boeck	2009.057.000	Painting	
John E. Rankin		1939	Margaret Brisbine	2002.019.004	Painting	
John G. Carlisle		1911	Ellen Day Hale	2005.016.031	Painting	
John J. Rhodes		1980	Herbert E. Abrams	2005.151.000	Painting	
John J. Fitzgerald		1917	Kenyon Cox	2002.006.017	Painting	
John LaFalce		1995	Elson Alexandre Photography	2002.014.002	Painting	
John Moakley		2001	Gary D. Hoffman	2002.017.001	Painting	
John Kee		1949	Alfred Jonniaux	2002.010.009	Painting	
John Kline		2016	Laurel Stern Boeck	2016.207.000	Painting	
John L. Mica		2012	Ned Bittinger	2012.070.000	Painting	
John L. McMillan		1966	Charles Hoover	2008.003.000	Painting	
John Marshall		1880	Richard N. Brooke and William de Hartburn Washington	2006.171.000	Painting	
John M. Jones		1952	Boris B. Gordon	2002.009.007	Painting	
John McKee		1799	Robert Field	2004.090.001	Painting	
John Spratt		2015	Chas Fagan	2015.096.000	Painting	
John N. Garner		1939	Seymour Stone	2005.016.039	Painting	
John Quincy Adams		2002	Ed Ahlstrom	2002.047.000	Painting	
John Quincy Adams		1845	John C. King	2021.082.000	Bust	
John Kasich		2001	Paul Benney	2002.008.001	Painting	
John Taber		1960	Frank de Bruin Valerius	2002.006.008	Painting	
John W. Taylor		1852	Gibson (Note: An exact name is never given, the artist of the work is logged as "Gibson" in the portrait database.)	2005.030.001	Painting	
John W. Taylor		1900	Caroline L. O. Ransom	2005.016.009	Painting	
John W. Davis		1911	William D. Murphy	2005.016.017	Painting	
John White		1911	William G. Barry	2005.016.015	Painting	
John W. Flannagan		1959	Dalton Shourds	2002.009.002	Painting	
John W. McCormack		1966	Victor Lallier	2005.016.045	Painting	
John Patman		1966	Victor Lallier	2002.013.003	Painting	
John Patman		1972	Victor Lallier	2002.014.006	Painting	
John Winston Jones		1911	James Brade Sword	2005.016.016	Painting	
Jonathan Dayton		1911	Henry Harrison	2005.016.003	Painting	
Jonathan Trumbull Jr.		1880	Harry Ives Thompson	2005.016.002	Painting	
Joseph Varnum		1853	Charles L. Elliott	2005.016.006	Painting	
Joseph G. Cannon		1904	Freeman Thorp	2002.006.010	Painting	
Joseph G. Cannon		1912	William Smedley	2005.016.035	Painting	
Joseph G. Cannon		1913	Albert Jaegers	2005.025.000	Bust	
Joseph H. Rainey		2004	Simmie Knox	2004.098.000	Painting	
Joseph J. Mansfield		1943	Boris B. Gordon	2002.022.002	Painting	
Joseph L. Evins		1965	Lloyd Embry	2002.014.007	Painting	
Joseph Sherley		1919	Charles Sneed Williams	2002.006.016	Painting	
Joseph Fordney		1919-1923	Underwood and Underwood	2002.021.017	Painting	
Joseph Keifer		1912	Charles A. Gray	2005.016.030	Painting	
Joseph Byrns		1933	George B. Matthews	2002.006.009	Painting	
Joseph Byrns		1937	Ella Hergesheimer	2005.016.041	Painting	
Joseph W. Martin Jr.		1959	Boris B. Gordon	2005.016.044	Painting	
Joseph W. Martin Jr.		1962	Suzanne Silvercruys	2005.028.000	Bust	
Joseph W. Martin Jr.		1955	Irving Resnikoff	2005.152.000	Painting	
Joshua Reed Giddings		1859	Caroline L. O. Ransom	2017.077.000	Painting	

== See also ==
- Art in the White House
- Art in bronze and brass
- List of statues
- United States Capitol art
- United States Senate Vice Presidential Bust Collection
