= A Cascade of Books =

Bronze sculpture in Washington, D.C.

- Falling Books
- Artist: Frank Eliscu
- Year: 1983
- Medium: Bronze
- Dimensions: (50 feet in × 35 ft in); 50' x 35'
- Weight: 27 tons
- Location: Main entrance to the James Madison Memorial Building

A Cascade of Books is a bronze sculpture completed in 1983 by Frank Eliscu. The sculpture is 50 feet (15 m) tall, weighs 27 tons, and is located at the main entrance of the James Madison Memorial Building at the United States Capitol Complex. The sculpture cost $313,000 (1983 USD) to complete.

== See also ==
- List of artwork at the United States Capitol complex
