= Freeman Thorp =

American painter

- Thorp in 1920

Member of the Ohio House of Representatives from Ashtabula County
- In office January 7, 1878 – January 4, 1886
- Preceded by: William P. Howland
- Succeeded by: Elbert L. Lampson

Member of the Ohio House of Representatives

Personal details
- Born: Freeman Woodcock Thorp; June 16, 1844 Geneva, Ohio, U.S.
- Died: October 20, 1922 (aged 78) Crow Wing County, Minnesota, U.S.
- Spouse: Orlena Eggleston (m. 1865)

Freeman Woodcock Thorp (or Thorpe; June 16, 1844 – October 20, 1922), was an American painter who painted portraits of many notable people such as Abraham Lincoln, James Garfield, William McKinley, Grover Cleveland, Ulysses Grant, Simon Cameron, Salmon Chase, Robert Smith, Horace Greeley, Walter Forward and Robert E. Lee. He was also a state legislator in Ohio and a soldier.

== Biography ==
=== Early life ===
Freeman Thorp was born in Geneva, Ohio, in 1844 to Clarissa and Dennis Thorp. His father was the first mayor of Geneva and a justice of the peace, nicknamed "Squire". He apparently began practicing his skills with art from an early age. At the age of 16 or 17, Thorp first encountered Abraham Lincoln as his inaugural train traveled through Geneva on February 15, 1861. This is said to be when Thorp created his first sketch of Lincoln.

When the American Civil War broke out in 1861, Thorp enlisted with the 2nd Ohio Cavalry Regiment, serving as a scout in southern Missouri. He is also said to have carried a missive from camp in Tennessee to Secretary of War Edwin Stanton. As a reward, Stanton arranged for Thorp to be placed close to Lincoln as he gave his address at Gettysburg, Pennsylvania on November 19, 1863. He also sketched the President on this occasion.

=== Artwork ===
Following the war, Thorp trained as a photographer under the instruction of his sister, Ruby M. Thore, and also began teaching himself to paint portraits. He left Ruby's studio in 1869 or 1870 to open his own photography studio in Bucyrus, Ohio. Through the 1870s, he gained popularity, especially among politicians in Washington, D.C. Ulysses S. Grant, who Thorp had met during the Civil War, helped to arrange for him to have a studio space above the Senate wing in the United States Capitol. Between his Capitol studio, his studio in Geneva, and travel around the country, Thorp is estimated to have created roughly 600 works. His subjects included presidents, governors, Congressmen, Cabinet members, generals, and other well-known figures of his day.

=== Later life and death ===
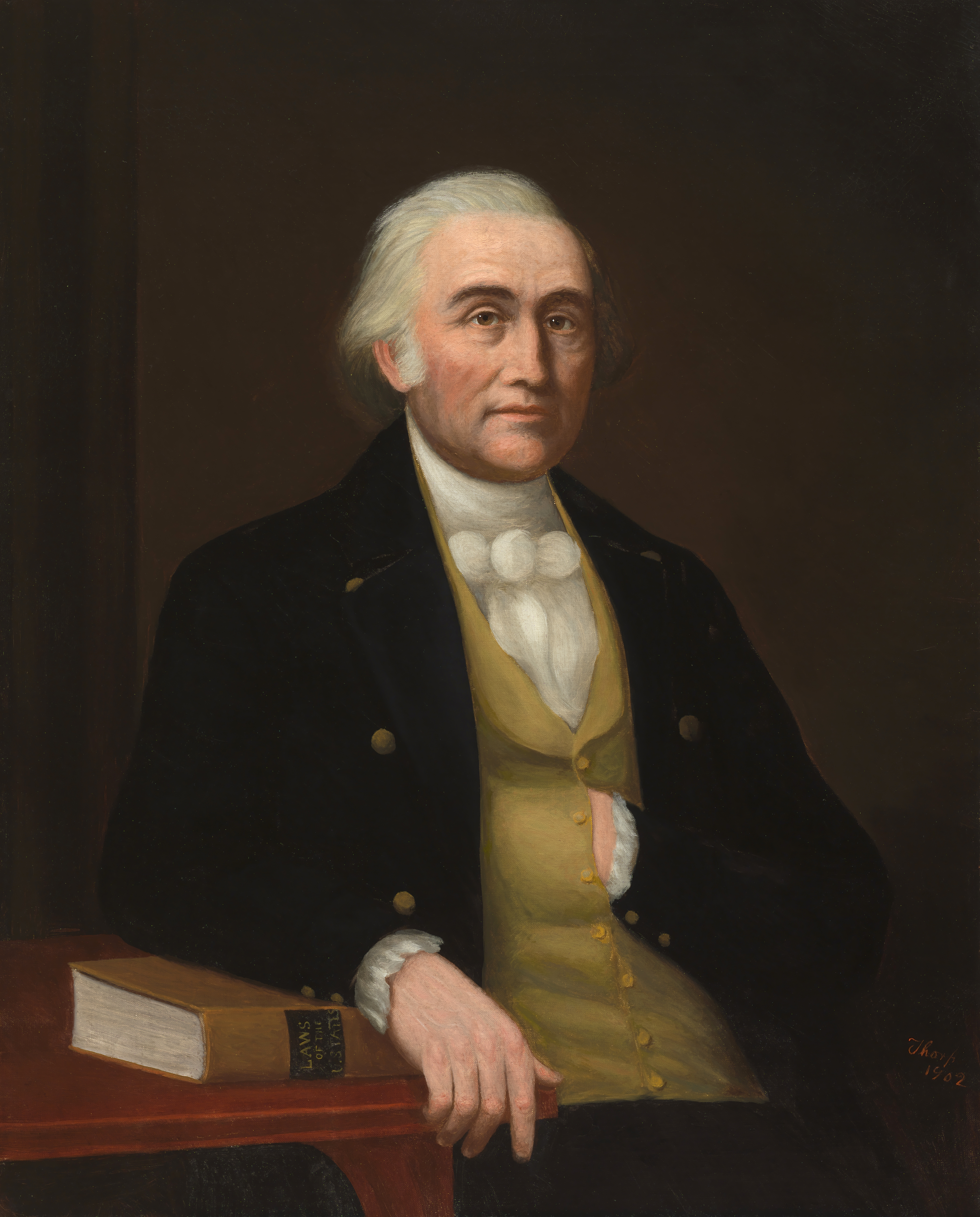
Portrait of Robert Smith, c. 1902

In addition to his artistic endeavors, Thorp was elected to the Ohio House of Representatives in 1878, a position he held for four terms. He also served as a commander of the Ohio National Guard until 1885, and achieved the rank of colonel through his service.

In the 1890s, he moved to Crow Wing County, Minnesota due to ill health, and began to farm trees on his land there. He also continued painting until his death. Arguably his most well-known work, a portrait of Abraham Lincoln, was commissioned by the United States Senate in 1920, and the painting hangs in the United States Capitol today.

Thorp died in Crow Wing County on October 20, 1922, at the age of 78.

== Marriage and children ==
Freeman Thorp married Orlena Eggleston (1847–1919) in Geneva, Ohio in 1865. They had four children:

- Nellie I. (Thorp) Rowland (1867–1900)
- Clark L. Thorp (1869–1896)
- Anna A. (Thorp) Benson (1879–1969)
- Sarah E. (Thorp) Heald (1881–1954)
