= Filippo Costaggini =

Italian painter (1839–1904)

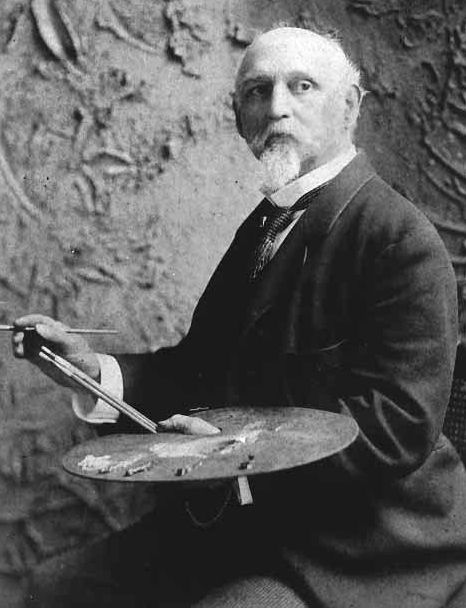
Filippo Costaggini

Filippo Costaggini (1839–April 15, 1904) was an Italian artist from Rome, Italy, who worked in the United States Capitol. He and Constantino Brumidi both trained at the Accademia di San Luca in Rome, and he came to the United States in 1870. In addition to working in the United States Capitol, Costaggini was well known for decorating churches. He decorated the parlor ceiling and walls of the Billmeyer House in York, Pennsylvania. He is known mainly for his work on the frieze in the United States Capitol Rotunda where he continued the work of Brumidi after he died.

Costaggini was selected to complete the remaining eight scenes of the frieze in the United States Capitol Rotunda. Using the late Constantino Brumidi's sketches, Costaggini finished his work on the frieze in 1889—leaving a 31-foot (9.4 m) gap because of early miscalculations about the height of the frieze. Costaggini had hoped to fill the gap with three scenes that he had designed himself, however, the U.S. Congress failed to approve his designs before his death. Costaggini died at his home in Maryland on April 15, 1904.
