= George Pollard (painter) =

American painter

George Pollard (March 20, 1920 – April 17, 2008) was an American portrait painter born in Waldo, Wisconsin, whose subjects included Harry S. Truman and Muhammad Ali.

Pollard served in the United States Marine Corps during World War II. When Eleanor Roosevelt visited Australia, Pollard was ordered to paint her portrait. She hung it in the White House.

Pollard died of pneumonia in Kenosha, Wisconsin.
