= Irving Resnikoff =

Russian-born American painter (1897–1988)

- Born: 1897; Russia
- Died: 1988 (aged 90–91)
- Occupation: Portrait painter

Irving Resnikoff (1897–1988), also known by his alias Charles J. Fox, was a Russian-born painter who emigrated to the United States. He is known for the many portraits of prominent politicians and business people that he painted under commission to the art dealer Leo Fox.

== Life ==
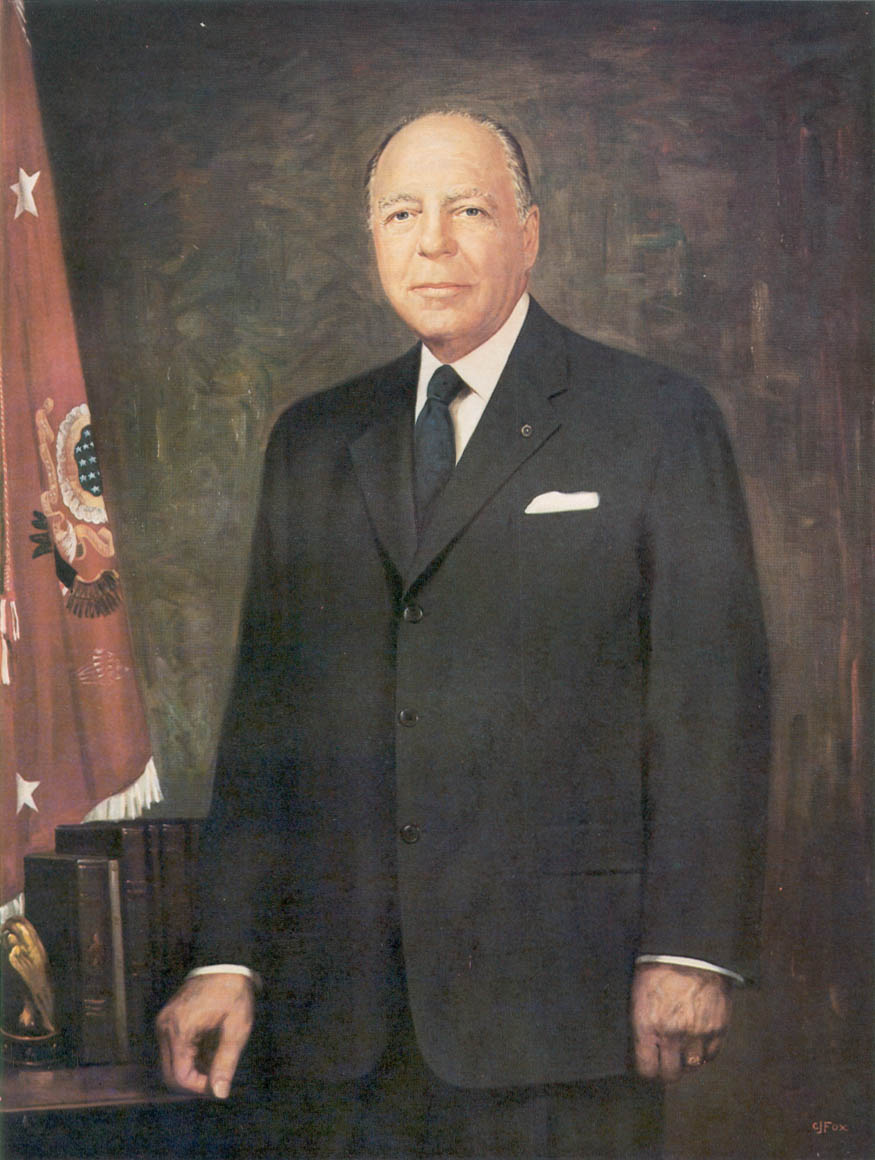
Wilber M. Brucker, Secretary of the Army, 1955-1961, by "CJ Fox"

CJ Fox signature on the Brucker portrait

Irving Resnikoff was born in Russia in 1897, and studied art at the Imperial Academy of Arts in Saint Petersburg. He trained as a Cubist painter. During the Russian Revolution of 1917 he fled from Russia. In 1923 he arrived in New York City. He was not able to make a living by selling his abstract paintings, and instead made portraits in the conventional style expected at that time.

Leo Fox was the son of an artist who died in 1944. He became a well-connected art dealer in Miami and Long Island. In 1943 Fox proposed that Congress set up a government portrait commission. Starting in the 1950s Leo Fox began to commission Resnikoff to paint portraits of prominent Americans under the pseudonym "Charles J. Fox". "Charles J. Fox" was said to be the son of an important Austrian artist. In fact, Leo Fox invented the name and set up Charles J. Fox, Inc. to avoid payment of taxes.

Resnikoff worked from photographs of the subject provided by Fox. He would use a photograph of the subject's head and shoulders, with other images for the body, hands and background. Each portrait was neatly signed "CJ Fox". Fox was the contracting agent for the portraits, and hired Resnoikoff to produce them. Resnikoff created his portraits at Sherman Square Studios in mid Manhattan, and worked there for Fox for forty years.

His niece described Resnikoff as a tall and debonair person, who “carried himself like a movie star with a mustache like Robert Taylor, a straight pipe between his teeth like Jimmy Stewart, dressed in tweeds like Fred Astaire.” In one year alone Resnikoff produced 58 portraits. Despite his low earnings, Resnikoff was able to afford to move with his wife to an apartment near the studio, which they furnished in the modern style of the time.

In 1978 the Internal Revenue Service charged Leo Fox $40,000 for unpaid taxes. Fox disputed the assessment on the basis that the portraits were produced by a corporation, which employed Resnikoff to paint the portraits. Resnikoff confirmed the arrangement in a signed affidavit. Fox paid Resnikoff from $250 to $300 for each portrait, and would sell them for as much as $7,000. He claimed that his profits from resale of the portraits were capital gains as opposed to the regular income that an artist might earn by painting a portrait.

Resnikoff died in 1988. Many of the "Charles J. Fox" paintings are still displayed in government offices, institutions and business headquarters.

== Portrait subjects ==
Portrait subjects include:

=== Politicians ===
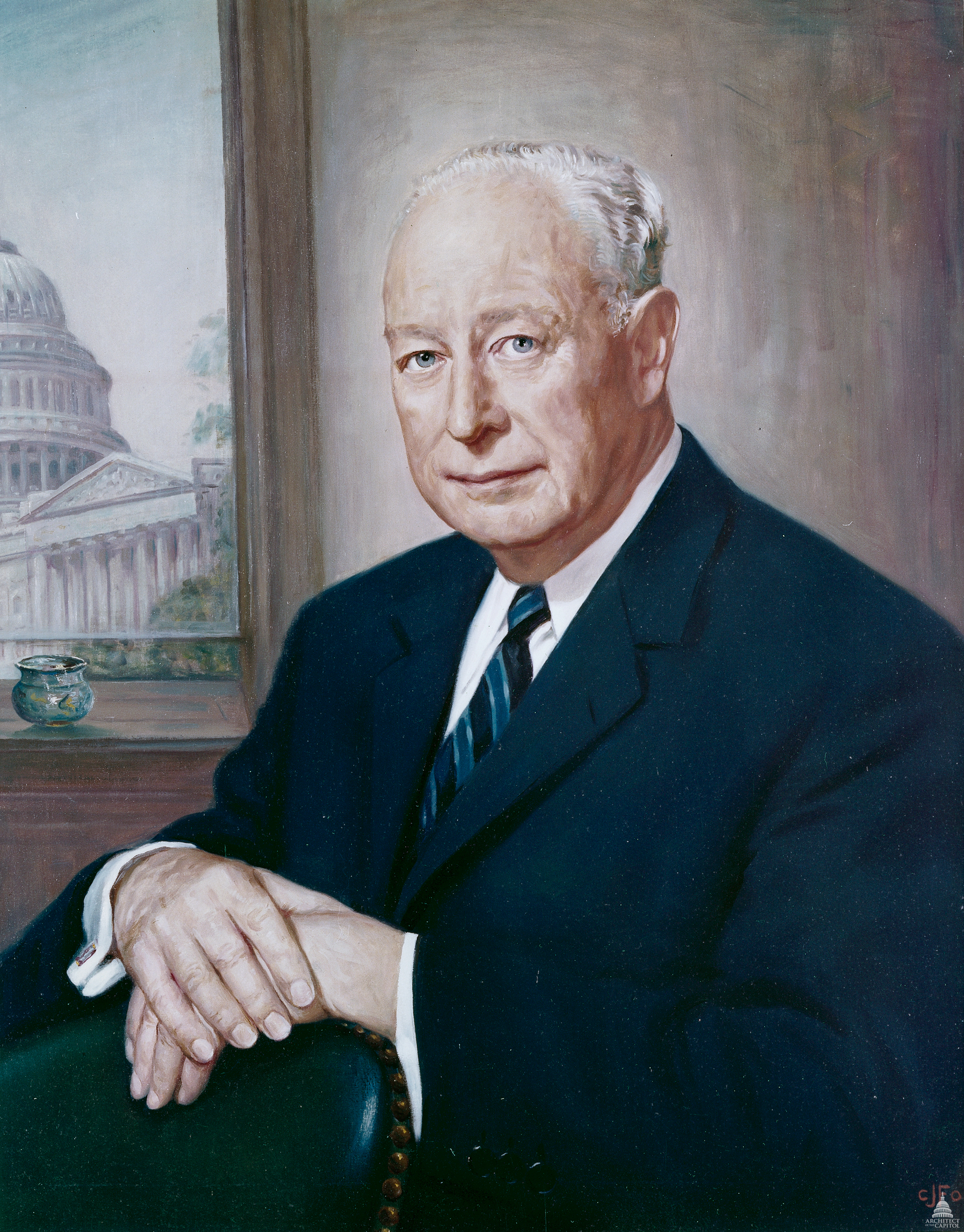
J. George Stewart, eighth Architect of the Capitol

- Stephen Ailes, Secretary of the Army
- Alben W. Barkley, Vice President of the United States
- Wilber M. Brucker, Secretary of the Army
- Clarence Cannon, Chairman of the House Appropriations Committee
- Henry H. Fowler, Secretary of the Treasury
- Stanley K. Hathaway, United States Secretary of the Interior
- Lewis Blaine Hershey, Selective Service System Director
- J. Edgar Hoover, Director of the Federal Bureau of Investigation
- John F. Kennedy, President of the United States
- George H. Mahon, Chairman of the House Appropriations Committee
- Elvis Jacob Stahr Jr., Secretary of the Army
- J. George Stewart, Architect of the Capitol
- Harlan F. Stone, Chief Justice
- Strom Thurmond, Senator

=== Businessmen ===
- J. Paul Austin (Coca-Cola)
- Harold Geneen (ITT Inc.)
- Amadeo Giannini (Bank of America)
- V. J. Skutt (Mutual of Omaha)

== Sources ==
- Art (August 6, 2015), The Artist Formerly Known as Fox, Office of the Historian
- Artist: CJ Fox, Utah Department of Heritage & Arts
- Association of American Law Schools (1983), Section Newsletters, AALS
- Bell, William Gardner (1992), Secretaries of War and Secretaries of the Army: Portraits & Biographical Sketches, Center of Military History, U.S. Army, ISBN 978-0-16-036191-3
- Clarence S. Brigham (1877-1963) (PDF), American Antiquarian Society
- "Irving Resnikoff: Drawing on paper. Matted, c.1930s", LiveAuctioneers
- "Stanley K. Hathaway (1924–2005)", Google Arts & Culture
