= Enrico Causici =

Italian sculptor (1790–1833)

- Born: 1790; Verona, Italy
- Died: August 1833 (aged 42–43); Havana, Cuba
- Occupation: Sculptor

Enrico Causici (1790 – August 1833) was an Italian sculptor of the 19th century.

== Biography ==
Born and trained in Italy, Enrico Causici emigrated to the United States of America in 1816.

Between 1817 and 1827, Causici participated in the sculptural decoration of the United States Capitol, where he worked alongside several of his compatriots, including Luigi Persico, Antonio Capellano, Giuseppe Valaperti, and Carlo Franzoni. He sculpted two large sandstone bas-reliefs for the rotunda: The Landing of the Pilgrims, 1620 (1825, above the east door) and Conflict of Daniel Boone and the Indians, 1773 (1827, above the south door).

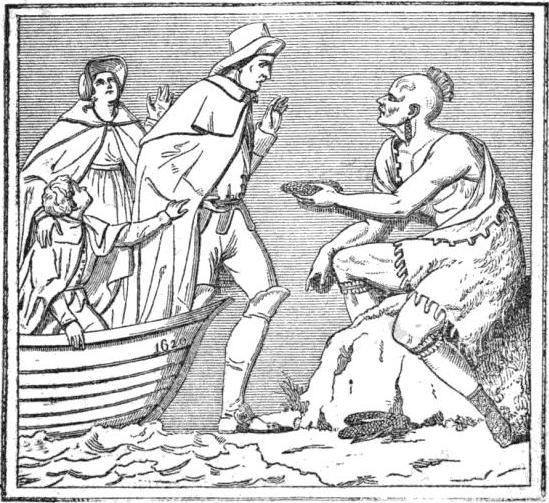
The Landing of the Pilgrims

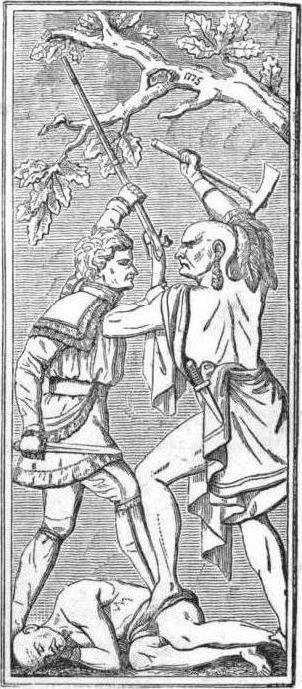
Conflict of Daniel Boone and the Indians

He also sculpted the statue Liberty and the Eagle for the Old Hall of the House of Representatives and a bust with wreaths of Christopher Columbus together with Antonio Capellano.

He designed the statue of George Washington's resignation as commander-in-chief that sits atop the Washington Monument in Baltimore, Maryland.

Later residing in New York City, Causici made a bust of DeWitt Clinton in 1832 for city hall.

Having contracted cholera during a stay in Cuba, he died in Havana in August 1833, without having been able to complete his project of an equestrian statue of George Washington for New York City.

== Gallery ==
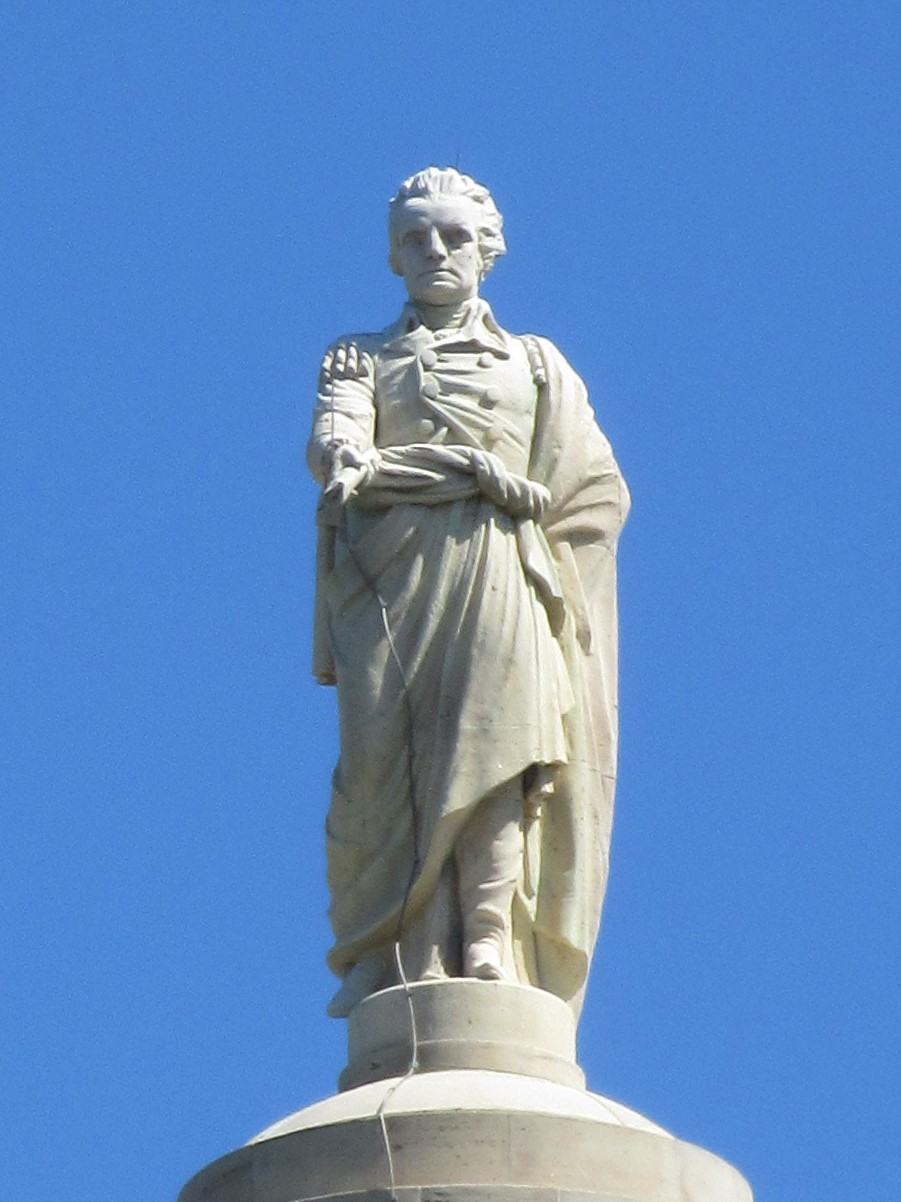
Resignation of George Washington, Washington Monument

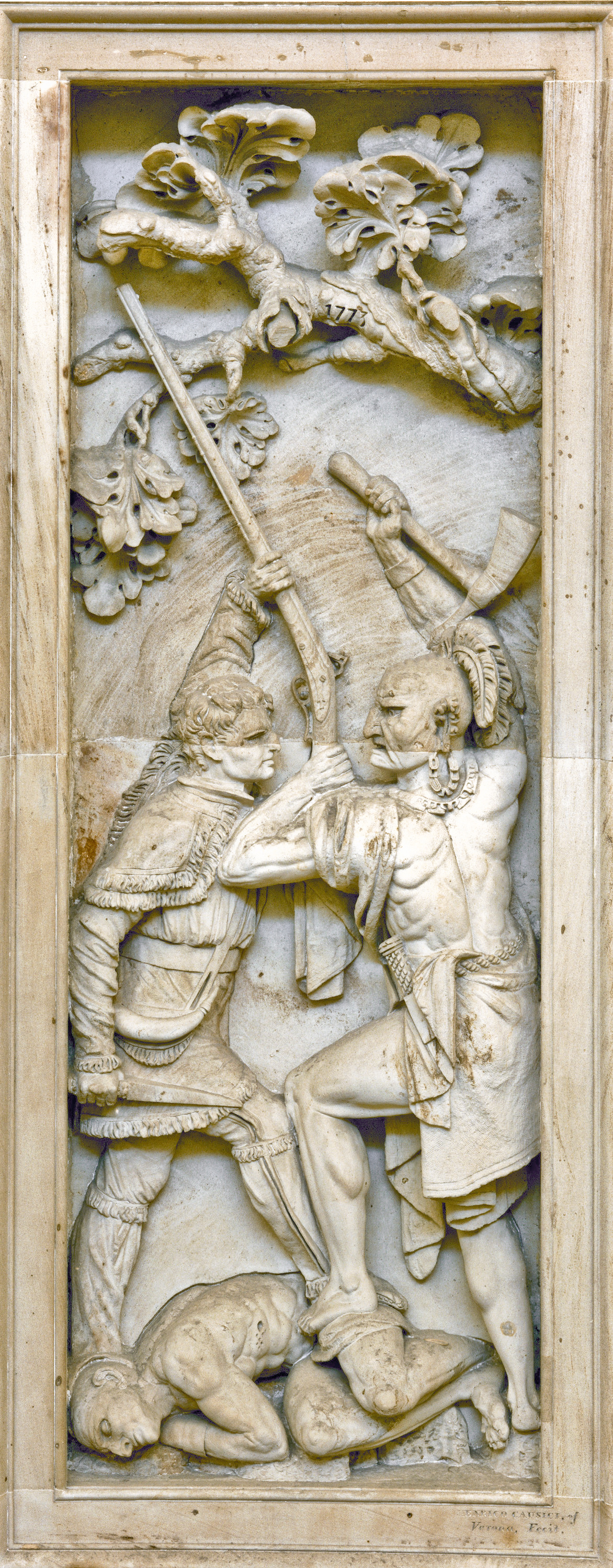
Conflict of Daniel Boone and the Indians, 1773, U.S. Capitol

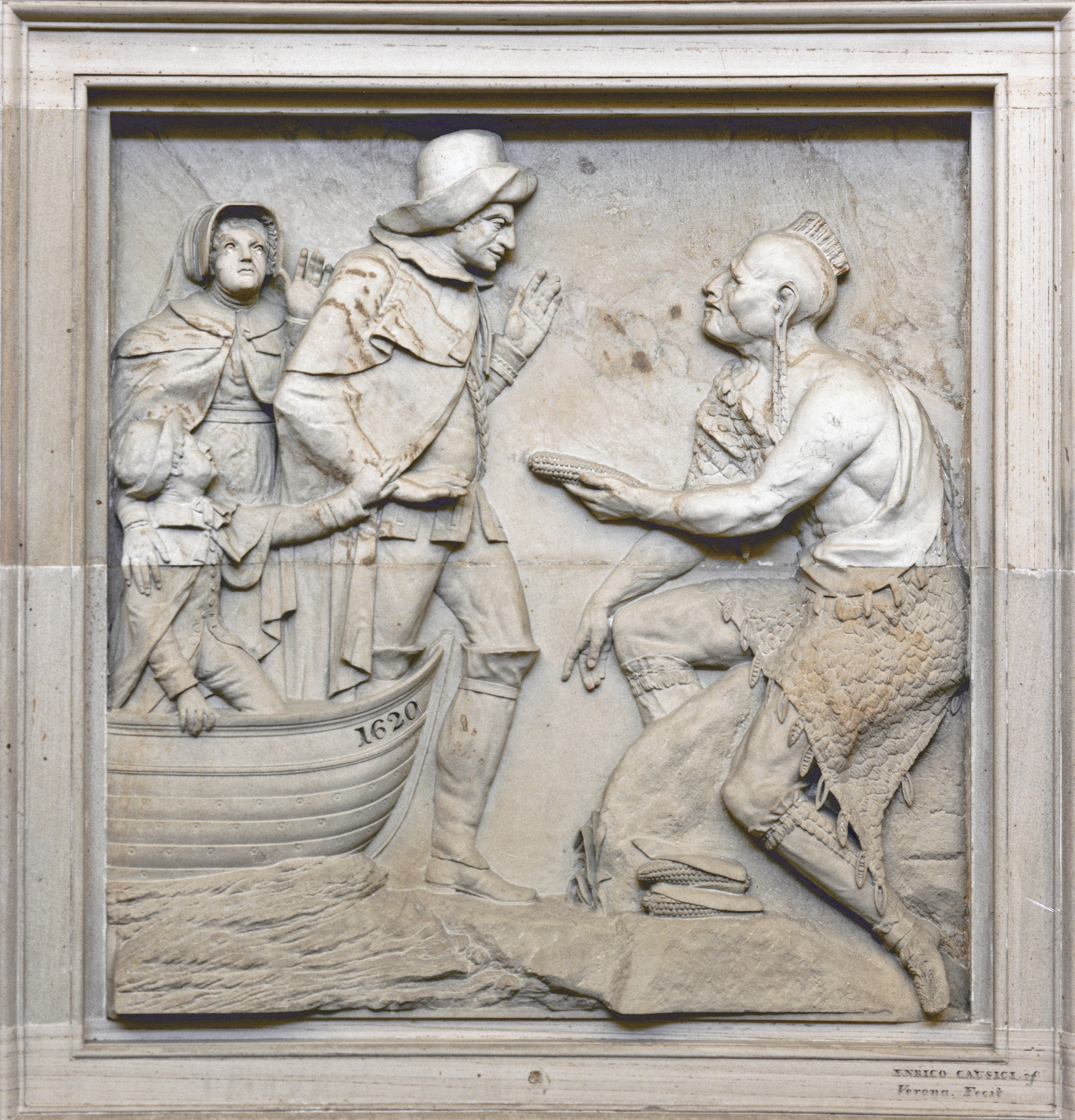
Landing of the Pilgrims, 1620, U.S. Capitol

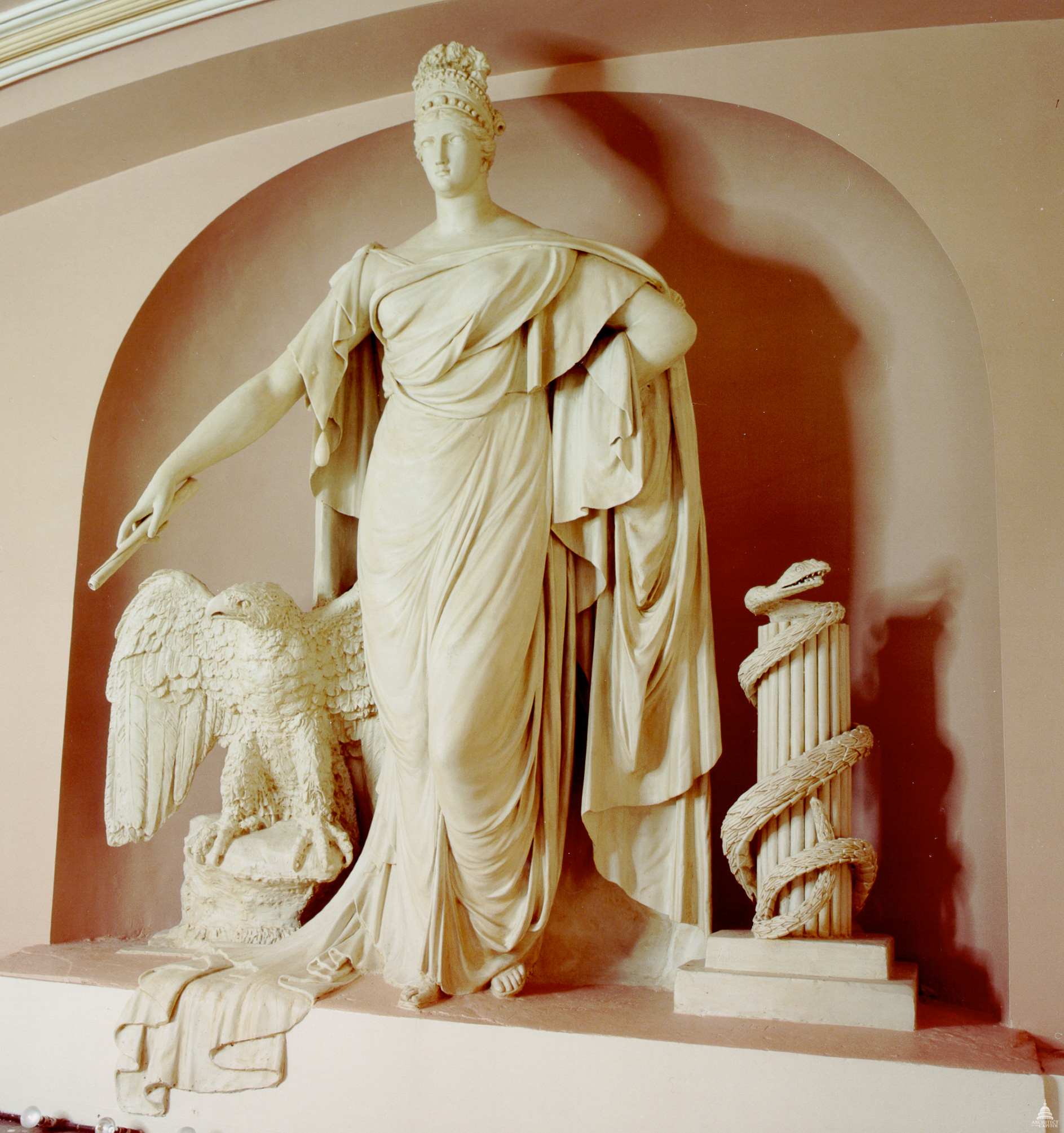
Liberty and the Eagle, National Statuary Hall
