= Marshall Bouldin III =

American painter

Marshall Bouldin III (September 6, 1923 – November 12, 2012) was an American portrait artist from Mississippi.

== Biography ==
Bouldin was born in Dundee, Mississippi, a small farming community in the northwest part of Mississippi, near the Mississippi River. He worked at his family's cotton farm until he became a professional portrait artist during the 1950s.

He painted more than 800 individuals throughout his life, including such notable subjects as Speaker of the United States House of Representatives Jim Wright, Mississippi Governor William Winter, United States Senator John C. Stennis of Mississippi, Tricia Nixon Cox, Julie Nixon Eisenhower, William Faulkner, Space Shuttle Challenger crew member Ronald McNair, United States Representative Claude Pepper of Florida, and Thea Bowman.

Examples of his oil paintings are currently held in more than 400 private and public art collections throughout the United States. The New York Times once praised Bouldin as "the South's foremost portrait painter." Bouldin became the first painter to be inducted into the National Portrait Artist Hall of Fame of the Portrait Society of America.

Bouldin, a resident of Clarksdale, Mississippi, died at St. Francis Hospital in Memphis, Tennessee, on November 12, 2012, at the age of 89.
