= Statue of Samuel J. Kirkwood =

Statue in the U.S. Capitol

Samuel J. Kirkwood
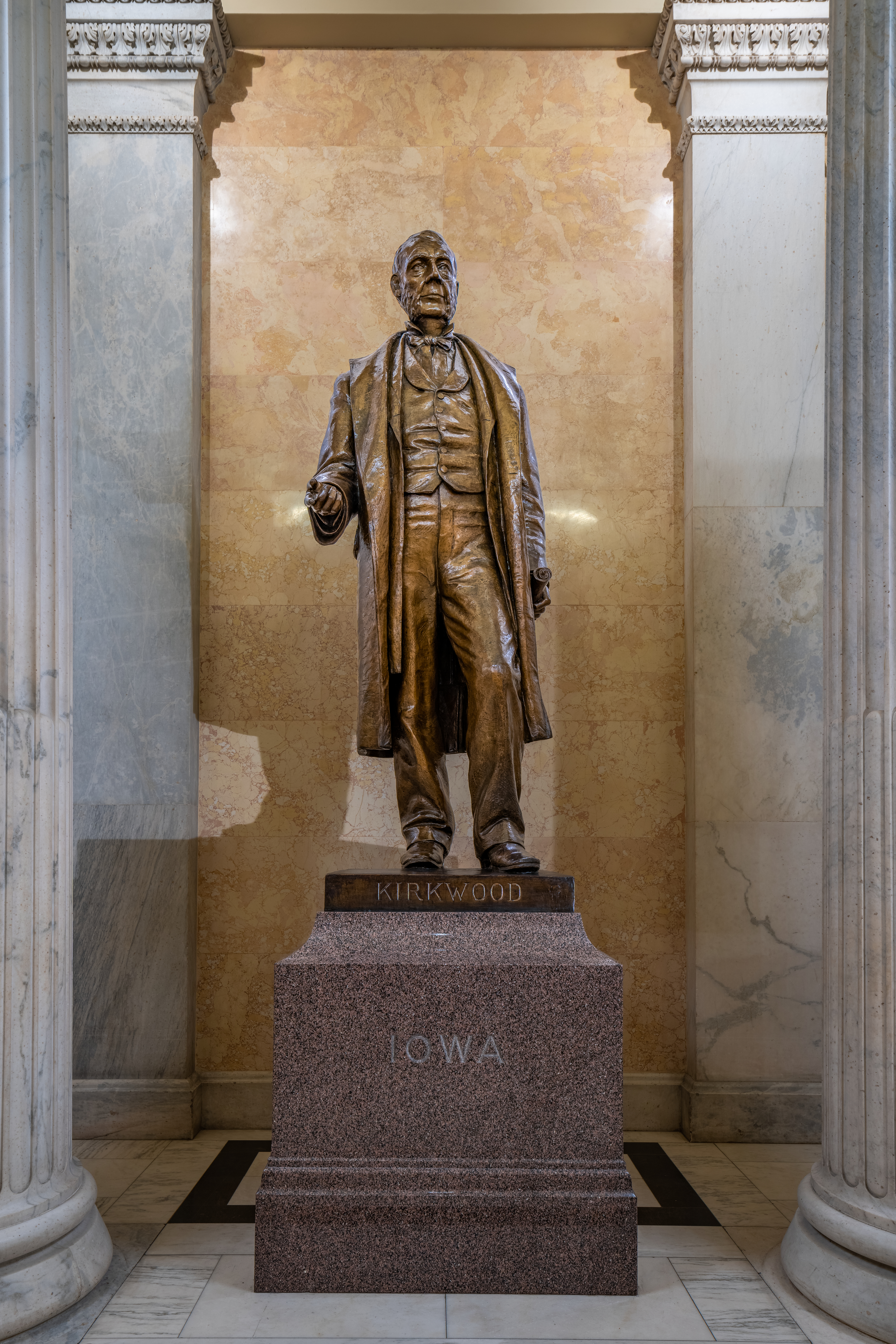
- The statue at the Hall of Columns in 2023
- Artist: Vinnie Ream
- Subject: Samuel J. Kirkwood

Samuel Kirkwood is a bronze statue created by Vinnie Ream and placed in the National Statuary Hall Collection in the Capitol Building in Washington, D.C., one of the two statues there from Iowa. It was dedicated in 1913.

Ream, who had achieved some degree of fame as a teenager for her 1866 statue of Abraham Lincoln that stands in the Capitol, learned that the State of Iowa had decided to commission a statue of Kirkwood. Despite the fact that Kirkwood had been one of the Congressmen who had voted against awarding the Lincoln statue to Ream, she set about getting and succeeded in garnering the opportunity to do it. Ream had at that point been retired from sculpting for almost two decades but with the backing of Kirkwood's widow Jane Kirkwood won the assignment. On April 5, 1906, the Iowa General Assembly voted to award the statue to Ream, along with $5,000 for the casting in bronze of her model. Because she was not up to the physical demands of the task, Ream's husband Richard, an engineer, devised a special "boatswain's chair" that allowed her to raise and lower herself in a seated position while working on the statue.

In 1924, it was announced that a "handsome bronze statue of Iowa's war governor" would be erected in front of the Iowa Old Capitol Building on the University of Iowa campus in Iowa City. The plaster that Ream had made for the Washington, D.C., statue was still in her studio, though she had died a decade earlier. In November 1927, the new casting was completed and dedicated in front of the Old Capitol. In 1974, the statue was moved to Kirkwood Community College. There it was placed initially indoors in a new building then later moved to an exterior place on the campus.
