= List of shipwrecks in August 1824 =

The list of shipwrecks in August 1824 includes some ships sunk, foundered, grounded, or otherwise lost during August 1824.

== 1 August ==
List of shipwrecks: 1 August 1824
Ship	State	Description
Mariner	Spain	The armed brig exploded and sank off Salt Key Bank in an engagement with Padilla ( Gran Colombian Navy) with the loss of 49 of her 80 crew. Padilla rescued the survivors.

== 2 August ==
List of shipwrecks: 2 August 1824
Ship	State	Description
Brothers	United Kingdom	The ship was run down and sunk in the North Sea off Mundesley, Norfolk. Her crew were rescued.
St. Anthony	United Kingdom	The ship was driven ashore at the Cape of Good Hope.
Three Sisters	United States	The schooner was wrecked on the Hogsty Reef.

== 4 August ==
List of shipwrecks: 4 August 1824
Ship	State	Description
Ann	United Kingdom	The ship departed from Saint John, New Brunswick, British North America for Wexford. No further trace, presumed foundered in the Atlantic Ocean with the loss of all hands.

== 5 August ==
List of shipwrecks: 5 August 1824
Ship	State	Description
Cyno	United States	The brig was wrecked on the north west coast of Bermuda. She was on a voyage from New York to St. Croix.

== 6 August ==
List of shipwrecks: 6 August 1824
Ship	State	Description
Indian	(United Kingdom of Great Britain and Ireland) British North America	The ship was wrecked on the French Shore, Newfoundland with the loss of five of her crew. She was on a voyage from Montreal, Lower Canada to London, United Kingdom.
Jeune Laure	France	The ship collided with a tower at Havre de Grâce, Seine-Inférieure and was beached in a severely damaged condition. She was on a voyage from Marseille, Bouches-du-Rhône to Havre de Grâce.

== 8 August ==
List of shipwrecks: 8 August 1824
Ship	State	Description
Ida	Denmark	The brig was wrecked on the Goodwin Sands, Kent, United Kingdom. Her crew were rescued with the loss of three of the rescuers, She was on a voyage from St. Croix, Virgin Islands to Copenhagen.
Providence	United Kingdom	The brig was driven ashore on Exuma. She was on a voyage from Gibraltar to Havana, Cuba. Providence was later refloated and made for Nassau, Bahamas. She subsequently ran aground on the Channel Keys but was refloated and arrived at Nassau on 16 August, where she was condemned.

== 10 August ==
List of shipwrecks: 10 August 1824
Ship	State	Description
Aurora	United States	The ship was wrecked on the Avolho Rocks, off the coast of Brazil. She was on a voyage from Rio de Janeiro to Bahia.
George	(United Kingdom of Great Britain and Ireland) British North America	The brig sprang a leak and capsized in the Atlantic Ocean with the loss of all but two of her crew. The survivors were rescued on 15 August by Robert Burns (United States). She was on a voyage from Halifax, Nova Scotia to Jamaica.

== 11 August ==
List of shipwrecks: 11 August 1824
Ship	State	Description
Commerce	United Kingdom	The ship was driven ashore and wrecked in Biscay Bay. Her crew were rescued. She was on a voyage from Quebec City, Lower Canada, British North America to Chester, Cheshire.
Platoff	United Kingdom	The ship was driven ashore and damaged at Cape Pine, Newfoundland, British North America. She was on a voyage from Bay Chaleur to North Shields, County Durham. Platoff was later refloated and taken in to Trepassey, Newfoundland.

== 14 August ==
List of shipwrecks: 14 August 1824
Ship	State	Description
Aurora	France	The ship was driven ashore 3 nautical miles (5.6 km) from Quillebeuf-sur-Seine, Eure. She was on a voyage from Málaga, Spain to Havre de Grâce, Seine-Inférieure.
Wilding	United Kingdom	The ship foundered in the Atlantic Ocean with the loss of three of her crew. She was on a voyage from British Honduras to Cork.

== 15 August ==
List of shipwrecks: 15 August 1824
Ship	State	Description
George	(United Kingdom of Great Britain and Ireland) British North America	The ship capsized in the Atlantic Ocean with the loss of all but two of her crew. They were rescued by Robert Burns (United Kingdom). George was on a voyage from Halifax, Nova Scotia to Jamaica.

== 16 August ==
List of shipwrecks: 16 August 1824
Ship	State	Description
Phœnix	United Kingdom	The ship struck rocks and was damaged at Sydney, New South Wales.

== 17 August ==
List of shipwrecks: 17 August 1824
Ship	State	Description
Ebenezer	United Kingdom	The ship was severely damaged at Bristol, Gloucestershire.

== 18 August ==
List of shipwrecks: 18 August 1824
Ship	State	Description
Memel	United Kingdom	The flat collided with the flat Ranger (United Kingdom) and sank in the River Mersey with the loss of two of her crew.
Nossa Senhora de Assumpscão	Portugal	The schooner was driven ashore and wrecked at Pernambuco, Brazil.
Pacific	United States	The schooner sprang a leak in the English Channel off Portland, Dorset and was abandoned. She was on a voyage from Boston, Massachusetts to Cowes, Isle of Wight.

== 19 August ==
List of shipwrecks: 19 August 1824
Ship	State	Description
General Palafox	Spain	The ship departed from Santiago de Cuba for Havana, Cuba. She was subsequently wrecked on the Isle of Pines, Cuba.

== 21 August ==
List of shipwrecks: 21 August 1824
Ship	State	Description
Flora	Stettin	The ship sank off Swinemünde, Prussia. She was on a voyage from Liverpool, Lancashire, United Kingdom to Stettin.
Industry	United Kingdom	The ship was wrecked on the Haisborough Sands, in the North Sea off the coast of Norfolk with the loss of all but one of her crew.
Juno	United States	The ship was driven ashore and wrecked at Berck-sur-Mer, Pas-de-Calais, France. She was on a voyage from Philadelphia, Pennsylvania to Havre de Grâce, Seine-Inférieure, France.

== 22 August ==
List of shipwrecks: 22 August 1824
Ship	State	Description
Aurora	Danzig	The ship was driven ashore near Gravelines, Nord, France. She was on a voyage from Danzig to Buenos Aires, Argentina.

== 23 August ==
List of shipwrecks: 23 August 1824
Ship	State	Description
Sans Souci	France	The ship was driven ashore near Almería, Spain. She was on a voyage from Cette, Hérault to Bordeaux, Gironde.
Skene	United Kingdom	The ship was wrecked on Rottumeroog, Groningen, Netherlands. She was on a voyage from Saint Petersburg, Russia to London.

== 24 August ==
List of shipwrecks: 24 August 1824
Ship	State	Description
Forth	United Kingdom	The ship sank at Liverpool, Lancashire.

== 25 August ==
List of shipwrecks: 25 August 1824
Ship	State	Description
Eagle	United Kingdom	The ship ran aground on the Florida Reef. She was on a voyage from the West Indies to Newfoundland, British North America. Eagle was refloated on 6 September with assistance from USS Terrier (United States Navy) and taken in to Key West, Florida Territory.
Swift	United States	The ship was wrecked on the Isle of Pines, Cuba. Her crew were rescued. She was on a voyage from Charleston, South Carolina to the West Indies.

== 28 August ==
List of shipwrecks: 28 August 1824
Ship	State	Description
Hayti	Bremen	The ship departed from Saint Domingo for Bremen. No further trace, presumed foundered with the loss of all hands.

== 29 August ==
List of shipwrecks: 29 August 1824
Ship	State	Description
Hope	United Kingdom	The ship was wrecked at Maracaibo, Gran Colombia.

== 30 August ==
List of shipwrecks: 30 August 1824
Ship	State	Description
Harriet	United States	The ship foundered in the Mediterranean Sea. Her crew were rescued. She was on a voyage from Trieste to Baltimore, Maryland.
Young Proteus	United Kingdom	The ship was lost off the south coast of Anticosti Island, Lower Canada, British North America. She was on a voyage from Demerara to Quebec City, Lower Canada.

== Unknown date ==
List of shipwrecks: Unknown date in August 1824
Ship	State	Description
Endeavour	United Kingdom	The ship was driven ashore on Miquelon in late August. Her crew survived. She was on a voyage from Quebec City, Lower Canada, British North America to London.
Fisher Ames	United States	The ship was lost near Burke Sound.
Fly	United States	The ship capsized in a squall with the loss of four of her crew. She was on a voyage from Alvarado, Mexico to New York.
Ford	United Kingdom	The ship was wrecked on Hogland, Russia. She was on a voyage from Saint Petersburg, Russia to King's Lynn, Norfolk.
Four Brothers	(United Kingdom of Great Britain and Ireland) British North America	The ship was wrecked near "St. Shore's". Her crew were rescued, She was on a voyage from Arichat, Nova Scotia to St. John's, Newfoundland.
George Washington	United States	The schooner was wrecked in the Abaco Islands. She was on a voyage from Philadelphia, Pennsylvania to Havana, Cuba.
Harrison & Tomb	United Kingdom	The ship broke her back at Maryport, Cumberland.
Jessie	United Kingdom	The ship was abandoned in the North Sea. Her crew were rescued by Kingston (United Kingdom.
Leo	United States	The brig was abandoned in the Atlantic Ocean.
Mary	United Kingdom	The sloop was wrecked on the coast of Madagascar.
