= Charles H. Bell (naval officer) =

United States Navy officer

- Born: August 15, 1798; New York
- Died: February 19, 1875 (aged 76); New Brunswick, New Jersey
- Burial place: Elmwood Cemetery, North Brunswick, New Jersey
- Military career
- Allegiance: United States of America
- Branch: United States Navy
- Service years: 1812–1868
- Rank: Rear admiral
- Commands: USS Ferret; USS Dolphin; USS Constellation; Mediterranean Squadron; Pacific Squadron
- Conflicts: War of 1812; Second Barbary War; American Civil War

Charles Heyer Bell (August 15, 1798 – February 19, 1875) was a rear admiral in the United States Navy who served during the War of 1812, the Second Barbary War, and the American Civil War.

== Biography ==
Born in New York, Bell served as a midshipman on Lake Ontario. Later, Bell served on the Macedonian, under the command of Stephen Decatur, against Algiers.

In 1824, he was in command of the schooner USS Ferret, which capsized at sea. He (and other survivors) remained with the capsized vessel for twenty-one hours before being rescued. Five crew members died.

In 1839 the brig Dolphin, under his command, ascended an African river and compelled a native chief to pay for goods that had been taken from a U.S. vessel. In the 1840s he commanded U.S. Navy ships in the suppression of the slave trade. He captured three slavers off the African coast, one of them transporting more than 900 slaves.

During the Mexican-American War he commanded a sloop-of-war named Yorktown along the African coast, to disrupt the slave trade.

His commands included the Constellation in 1855, and the Norfolk Naval Shipyard from 30 April 1859 to 1 August 1860. At the beginning of the Civil War he was in command of the Mediterranean Squadron of the U.S. Navy.

On January 3, 1862 he was promoted to the newly established rank of Flag Officer (equivalent to the rank of Commodore) and he received command of the Pacific Squadron in July 1862 (replacing John B. Montgomery), which he held until 1864.

He was promoted to commodore on July 16, 1862, and in 1864 was transferred to the command of ships serving on the James River in Virginia. He was promoted to rear admiral on July 25, 1866. He retired in 1868, after serving for three years as commander of the Brooklyn Navy Yard. He died in New Brunswick, New Jersey in 1875 at the age of 76.

== Dates of rank ==
- Midshipman - 18 June 1812
- Lieutenant - 28 March 1820
- Commander - 10 September 1840
- Captain - 12 August 1854
- Flag Officer - 3 January 1862
- Commodore, Retired List - 16 July 1862
- Rear Admiral, Retired List - 25 July 1866
- Died - 19 February 1875

== Bibliography ==
- Spears, John Randolph (1905). David G. Farragut.
  G.W. Jacobs, Philadelphia. p. 407. Url
