= USS Ferret (1822) =

History

United States
- Name: USS Ferret
- Acquired: 20 December 1822 at Baltimore, Maryland
- Fate: Capsized in storm off Cuba, 4 February 1825, five died.

General characteristics
- Type: Schooner
- Tonnage: 51
- Sail plan: Schooner
- Complement: 31
- Armament: 3 guns

USS Ferret was a two masted schooner, the third U.S. Navy vessel to bear this name, and was purchased 20 December 1822 at Baltimore, Maryland and commissioned early in 1823, with Lieutenant R. Henley in command. It was the first U.S. naval ship commanded by the famous naval hero David Farragut. Ferret served transporting U.S. sailors, marines and supplies to the pirate infested waters of the Caribbean and was used to search out and attack pirate ships and pirate strongholds for a little more than two years when her career was cut short when the vessel capsized in a gale force storm off the coast of Cuba.

== Fighting piracy in the Caribbean ==
USS Ferret was part of a naval fleet that sailed to the Caribbean to subdue the occurrence of pirate raids on merchant ships that had increased to almost 3,000 by the early 1820s. The financial losses to the United States was great while murder and the practice of torture were common. Losses to American ships and merchants had increased to such proportions that the situation began making headlines in American newspapers. In little time merchants and shippers along with the American public were demanding that the U.S. Navy take definite action against piracy that was out of control in the Caribbean and Gulf of Mexico. In November 1822 when the captain of the USS Alligator was killed in a battle with the notorious Cuban pirate Domingo that was the last straw. Response was quick and by 22 December President James Monroe authorized the creation of the West Indies squadron (Note: Sometimes referred to as the West India squadron.) for purposes of seeking and routing out pirates and their numerous strongholds about the Caribbean and Gulf of Mexico. They were also directed to suppress the international slave trade which also operated out of this region and outlawed in the United States. Following Monroe's authorization the Secretary of the Navy, Smith Thompson, promoted David Porter to commodore, allocated $500,000 to him and appointed him to take commanded of and outfit the squadron for war against the pirates. British interests in the Caribbean also threatened, the West Indies squadron fought piracy in a concerted effort with the Royal Navy.

Ferret was now part of the largest fleet of American naval ships ever to be assembled during peacetime. Under the leadership of Commodore Porter along with subordinate commanders James Biddle and Lewis Warrington, the U.S. Navy's West Indies Squadron crushed the pirates who were relentlessly ferreted out from the uncharted bays and lagoons throughout the Caribbean by U.S. sailors and the West Indies Squadron of which the USS Ferret played an important role. Within two years piracy was subdued and within ten years, piracy in the Caribbean and Gulf of Mexico was all but eradicated completely.

=== Ferret's role ===
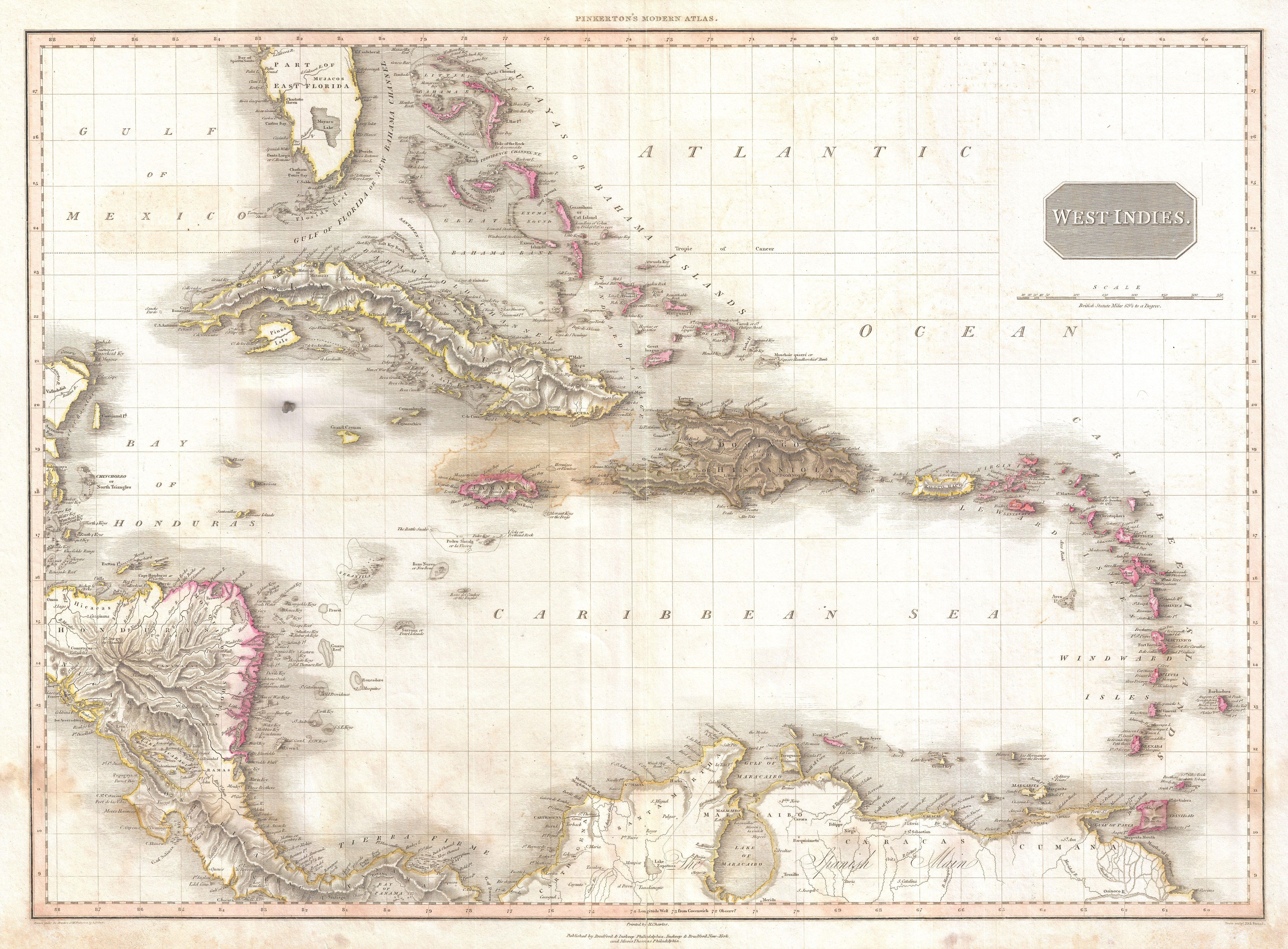
Map of early 1800s West Indies

Ferret sailed from Hampton Roads, Virginia, on 14 February 1823, bound for the West Indies, and became part of the West Indies Squadron, also known as the Mosquito Fleet. Smaller vessels like the Ferret were employed for the task because the larger Man-of-war ships were unable to pursue the typically smaller pirate vessels when they retreated into the many lagoons, rivers and creeks that were common to the numerous isles about the Caribbean.

Porter's squadron consisted of sixteen vessels: eight new shallow draft schooners, five large barges, a steam powered riverboat and a storeship schooner and a decoy merchant ship, the USS Decoy, that concealed several large guns. The newly acquired schooners were each armed with three guns and given the names USS Ferret, USS Beagle, USS Fox, USS Greyhound, USS Jackal, USS Terrier, USS Weasel, and the USS Wild Cat. The first day out to sea the fleet encountered a northeasterly gale forcing the fleet to hold up at the naval base at Key West. The Key West base was previously chosen as the base of operation because of its central location in pirate infested waters.

Along with escorting merchantmen, Ferret engaged a pirate barge and seven boats in Bacuna Yeauga bay in Cuba on 18 June 1823. During the battle the vessel received a small boat hole at the water line by a buccaneer's musket ball. Consequently, Ferret had to break off the attack, since a high wind and heavy sea prevented her from entering the channel. Seeking aid, Ferret retreated from the choppy coastal waters to the calmer waters of the open sea. The Ferret returned the next day with a boat loaned by a nearby British ship, only to find that the governor of the Spanish province had already confronted and dispersed the pirates.

David Farragut, a Lieutenant, at the age of 23, was given command of the Ferret by Commodore Porter later in the summer of 1823; it was his first command of a naval ship. Under Farragut, the Ferret transported sailors, Marines and supplies into the various points of operation along the north coast of Cuba and surrounding isles. During a stopover at Nassau one of his crewmembers, a deserter from the Royal Navy, hitherto unknown by Farragut, hailed a British ship asking to be removed from the Ferret. When Farragut learned of the incident and not tolerating any such foreigners aboard a naval vessel he disciplined the sailor and turned him over to British authorities at Nassau. After Ferret departed Nassau Farragut soon received orders to sail north to Navy yard in Washington for repairs, supplies, sailors and new crew members. Under Farragut Ferret made two such trips.

On 4 February 1825, the Ferret was under the command of Charles H. Bell. While patrolling the waters off the north shore of Cuba the Ferret capsized during a gale-force storm and heavy seas, about 8 miles off the port of Canasi. The next morning Ferret was almost completely under water and was now settling at a faster rate. The surviving sailors fashioned a raft by lashing the foremast and main boom together while several of the best swimmers headed for shore to get help. Commander Bell (and other survivors) remained with the capsized vessel for twenty-one hours before finally being rescued by the USS Jackal. By the time the storm finally subsided five crew members had perished while many others were wounded.

== See also ==
- List of historical schooners
- Piracy in the Caribbean
- West Indies Anti-Piracy Operations of the United States
- Alternative map of early 1800s West Indies
- Bibliography of early American naval history

== Bibliography ==
- Boot, Max (2007). The Savage Wars Of Peace: Small Wars And The Rise Of American Power.
  Basic Books. p. 428. ISBN 9780465004706., Book
- Bradlee, Francis Boardman Crowninshield (1923). Piracy in the West Indies and Its Suppression.
  Essex Institute. pp. 220., Book
- Dept U.S.Navy. "USS Ferret".
  Dictionary of American Naval Fighting Ships. Department of Navy - Naval Historical Center.
- Dept U.S.Navy (1996). "Operations Against West Indian Pirates 1822-1830s".
  Dictionary of American Naval Fighting Ships. Department of Navy - Naval Historical Center. Archived from the original on February 6, 1997.
- Farragut, Loyall (1879). The life of David Glasgow Farragut, first admiral of the United States navy:embodying his journal and letters.
  D. Appleton and company, New York. pp. 586. E'Book
- Konstam, Angus (2007). Predators of the Seas.
  Skyhorse Publishing Inc. pp. 240. ISBN 9781602390355., Book
- —— (2008). Piracy: The Complete History. Osprey Publishing. p. 336. ISBN 9781846032400. Book
- Mahan, Alfred Thayer (1892). Admiral Farragut.
  D. Appleton and company, New York. pp. 333. E'Book
- Porter, David Dixon (1875). Memoir of Commodore David Porter: of the United States Navy.
  J. Munsel, publishers, New York. p. 427. E'Book (Primary source)
- Spears, John Randolph (1905). David G. Farragut.
  G.W. Jacobs, Philadelphia. pp. 407. E'Book
- Wombwell, A. James (2010). The Long War Against Piracy: Historical Trends. Fort Leavenworth, Kansas:
  Combat Studies Institute Press. p. 204. ISBN 978-0-9823283-6-1., Book

=== Further reading ===
- Carey, Thomas (1834). The History of the Pirates
  Henry Benton, Hartford, Conn. p. 283, E'Book
- Wombwell, James A. (2010) The Long War Against Piracy: Historical Trends
  Combat Studies Institute, p. 204, ISBN 9781907521454, Book
