= USS Wild Cat (1822) =

History

United States
- Name: Wild Cat
- Commissioned: early 1823
- Fate: Foundered, 28 October 1824

General characteristics
- Type: Schooner
- Displacement: 48 long tons (49 t)
- Sail plan: Schooner
- Complement: 31
- Armament: 3 guns

USS Wildcat was a two masted schooner of 48 long tons (49 t). She was part of the West Indies Squadron, that sailed to the Caribbean to subdue the occurrence of pirate raids on merchant ships, that had increased to almost 3,000 incidents by the early 1820s.

== Construction ==
The first Wild Cat, a schooner, was purchased at Baltimore, Maryland, late in 1822, for service with the "mosquito fleet" formed by Commodore David Porter, to suppress the pirates, then ravaging seaborne commerce, in the West Indies. She was probably outfitted at Norfolk, Virginia, late in 1822 and commissioned early in 1823. She was armed with three guns and had a crew of 31.

== Service history ==
Wild Cat was one of eight, shallow-draft Chesapeake Bay schooners acquired to give the West Indies Squadron the capability of pursuing pirates into the shoal waters along the coasts of Cuba and Puerto Rico, where the freebooters sought refuge from justice. On 15 February 1823, she departed Hampton Roads, in company with the other ships of Commodore Porter's squadron. After a brief stop at Saint Thomas, Virgin Islands, on 4 March, she and her consorts headed for the coast of Puerto Rico, the following day. For the next 18 months, she intermittently patrolled the northern coast of Cuba and Puerto Rican waters searching for pirates and escorting convoys of merchantmen.

Wildcat was commanded by Lieutenant Legare', who sailed her to Washington, DC, with a dispatch regarding the disposition of the squadron and other matters concerning the war against piracy in the Caribbean. On 28 October 1824. Wildcat was lost in a gale with all hands while sailing between Cuba and Thompson's Island, West Indies. Approximately 31 drowned.

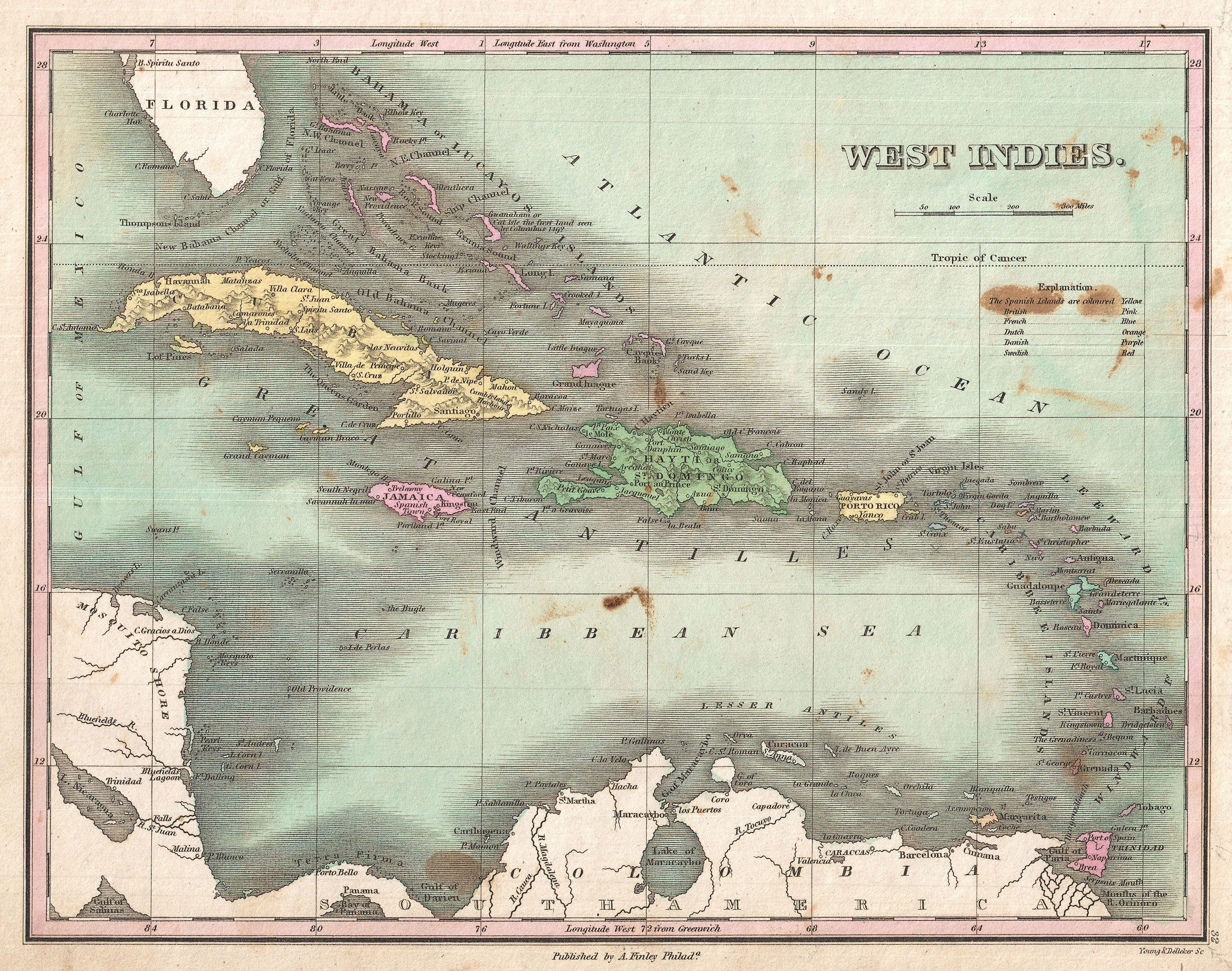
Map of early 1800s West Indies

== See also ==
- Ferret Ship that was also part of the same fleet as Wildcat
- List of historical schooners
- Piracy in the Caribbean
- West Indies Anti-Piracy Operations of the United States
- Alternative map of early 1800s West Indies
- Bibliography of early American naval history

== Bibliography ==
- Bradlee, Francis Boardman Crowninshield (5 December 2007) [1st Pub. 1923]. Piracy in the West Indies and Its Suppression. Essex Institute. p. 220. ISBN 9780598618450.
- "Wild Cat I (Sch)". Dictionary of American Naval Fighting Ships. Navy Department, Naval History and Heritage Command. 2 November 2015.
- Porter, David Dixon (1875). Memoir of Commodore David Porter: of the United States Navy. New York: Munsel. p. 427.
- Boot, Max (2007). The Savage Wars Of Peace: Small Wars And The Rise Of American Power. Basic Books. p. 428. ISBN 9780465004706.
