= Civil War Monuments in Washington, D.C. =

- U.S. National Register of Historic Places
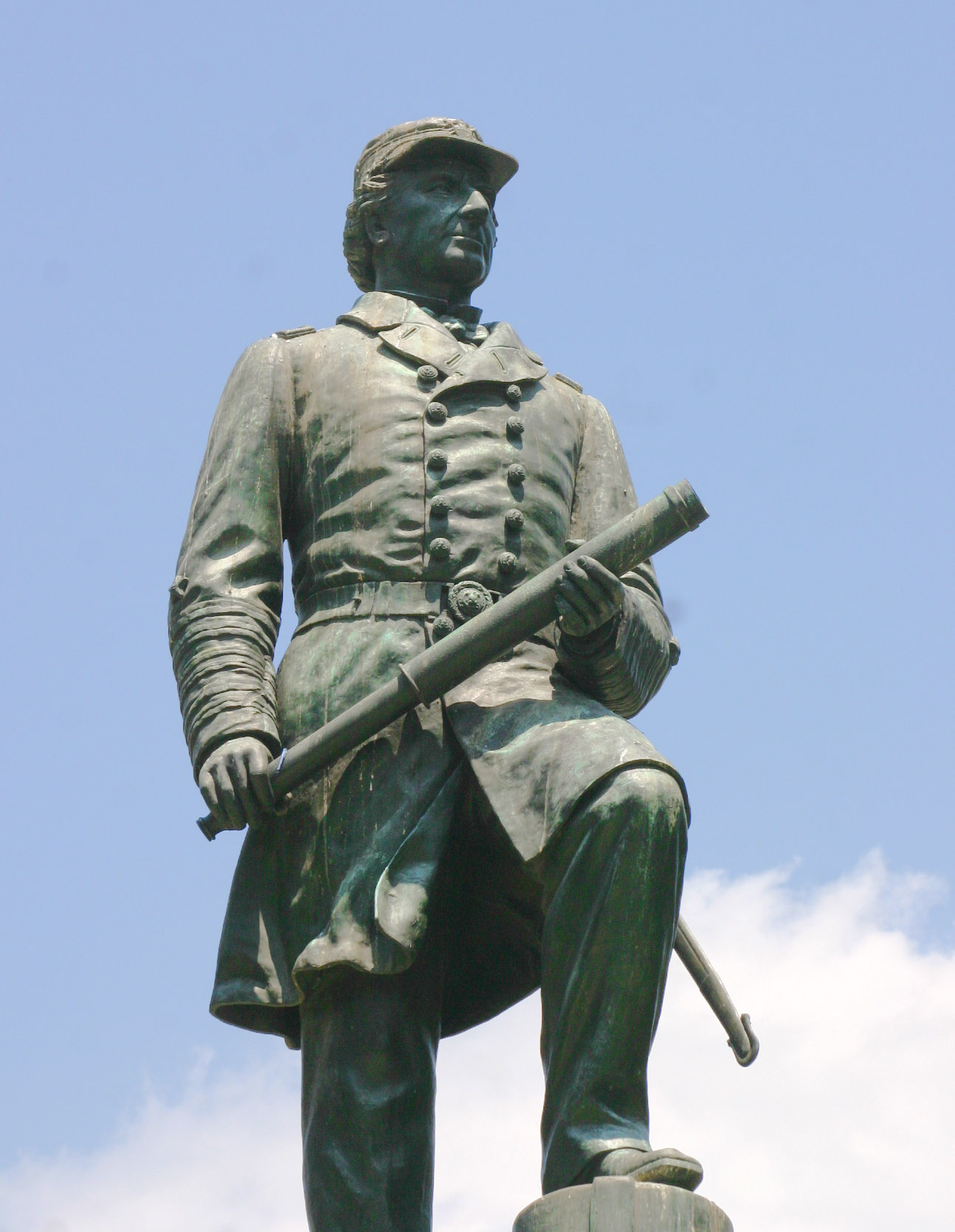
- Admiral David G. Farragut
- Location: Washington, D.C.
- NRHP reference No.: 78000257
- Added to NRHP: September 20, 1978

The Civil War Monuments in Washington, D.C. are a group of eighteen outdoor statues which are spread out through much of central and northwest Washington, D.C. The statues depict 11 Union generals and one Confederate general, Albert Pike, who is depicted as a Mason and not as a general. Two Union admirals are honored, although Admiral Samuel Francis DuPont's statue was removed to Wilmington, Delaware, and he is now honored with a fountain. Other statues depict nuns, peace, emancipation, and the Grand Army of the Republic.

In accordance with Executive Order 11593 by President Richard Nixon, the National Park Service surveyed and registered the 18 Civil War statues in Washington, D.C. to aid in their preservation. They are listed as a group on the National Register of Historic Places.

The African American Civil War Memorial 38°54′29″N 77°1′33″W was completed in 1997 and is not included in the group of historic statues.

== Statues ==
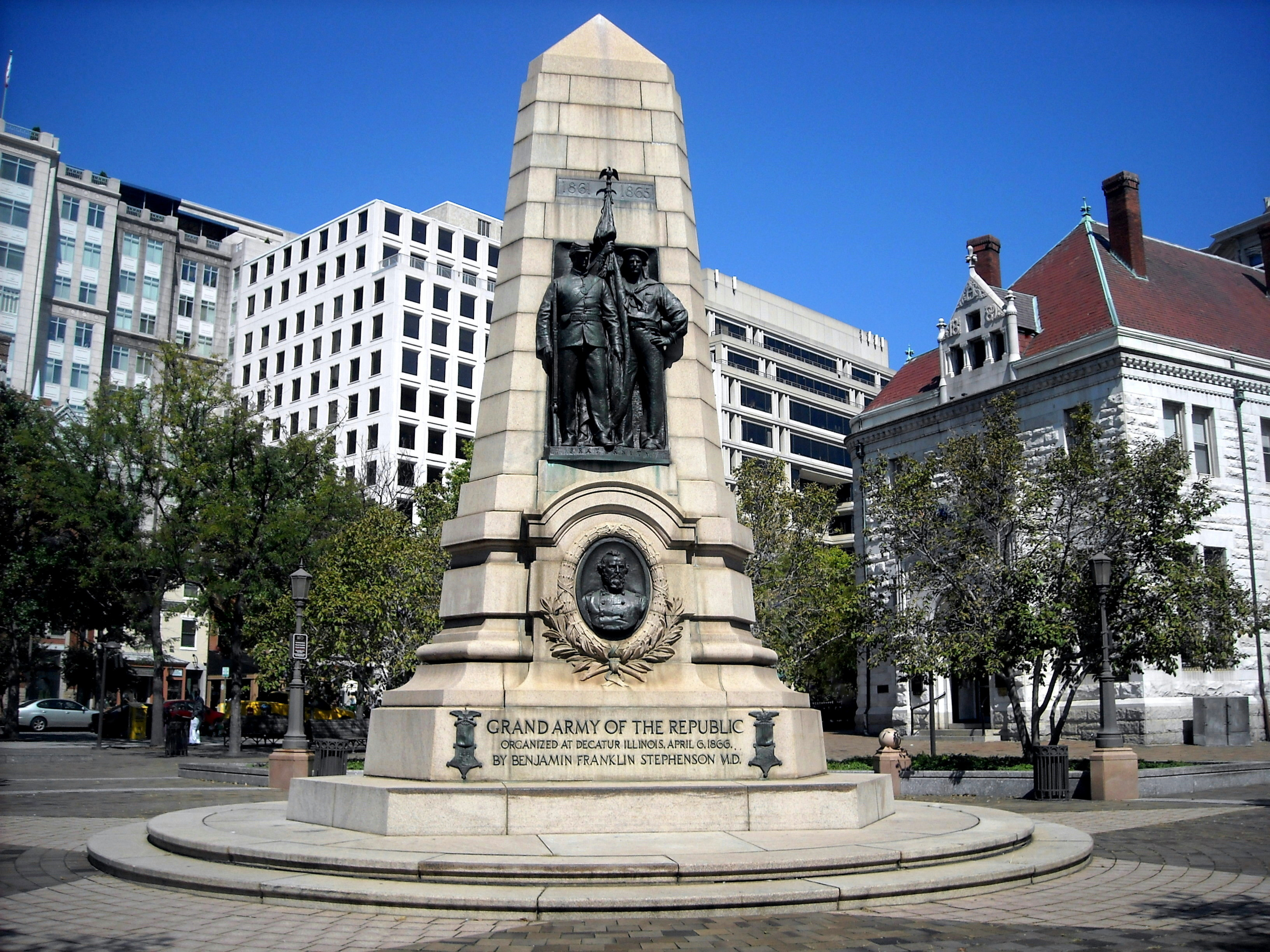
Stephenson Grand Army of the Republic Memorial

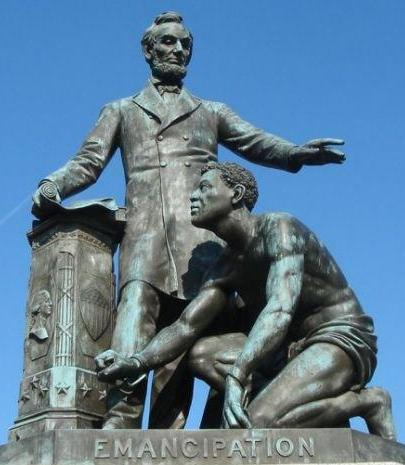
Emancipation Memorial

1. Samuel Francis DuPont Memorial Fountain 38°54′35″N 77°2′36″W
2. Nuns of the Battlefield 38°54′21″N 77°2′25″W
3. Stephenson Grand Army of the Republic Memorial 38°53′37″N 77°1′18″W
4. Peace Monument 38°53′26″N 77°0′44″W
5. Ulysses S. Grant Memorial 38°53′23″N 77°0′46″W
6. Major General James B. McPherson 38°54′7″N 77°2′3″W
7. Admiral David G. Farragut 38°54′7″N 77°2′20″W
8. Major General John A. Logan 38°54′35″N 77°1′47″W
9. Major General George Henry Thomas 38°54′20″N 77°1′57″W
10. Brevet Lt. General Winfield Scott 38°54′26″N 77°2′12″W
11. General Winfield Scott Hancock 38°53′37″N 77°1′20″W
12. General John A. Rawlins 38°53′45″N 77°2′31″W
13. General Philip Sheridan 38°54′44″N 77°3′2″W
14. Major General George B. McClellan 38°55′0″N 77°2′47″W
15. General William Tecumseh Sherman Monument 38°53′46″N 77°2′3″W
16. George Gordon Meade Memorial 38°53′32″N 77°0′59″W
17. Emancipation Memorial 38°53′23″N 76°59′25″W
18. Albert Pike Memorial 38°53′41″N 77°0′57″W

== See also ==
- American Revolution Statuary
- National Register of Historic Places listings in Washington, D.C.
