= Bust of Edwin B. Hay =

Sculpture by Vinnie Ream

Edwin B. Hay
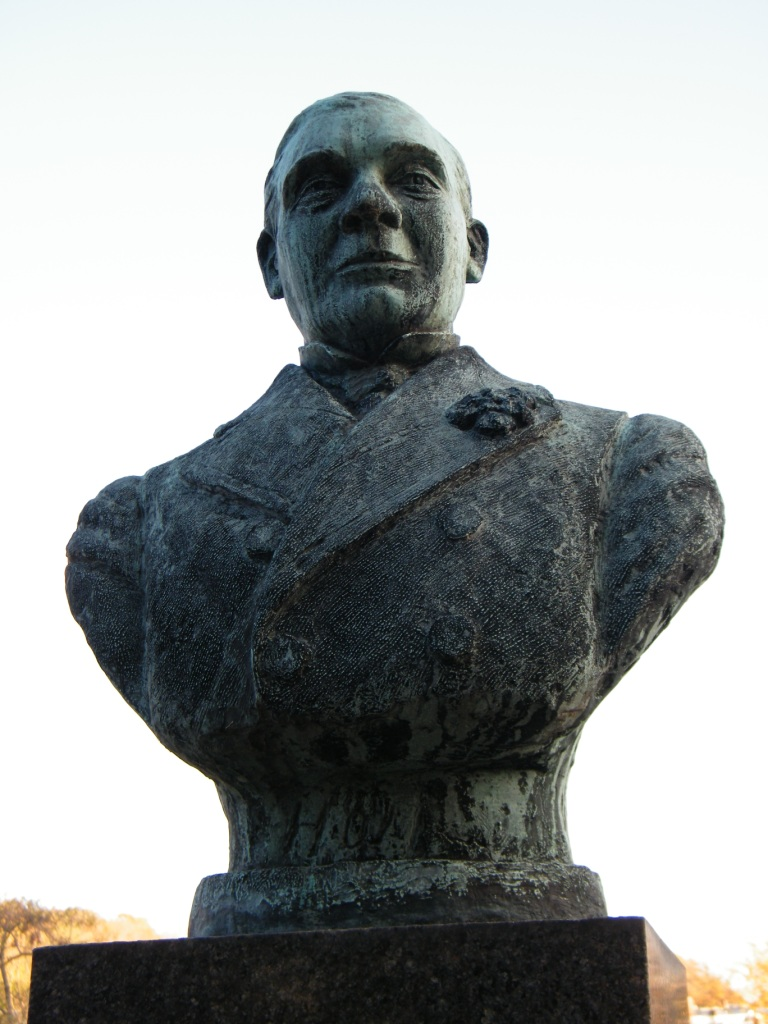
- Artist: Vinnie Ream
- Year: 1906
- Type: Bronze
- Dimensions: 76 cm × 58 cm × 40 cm (30 in × 22.8 in × 15.6 in)
- Location: Washington, D.C., United States; 38°56′56.03″N 77°0′33.36″W
- Owner: Rock Creek Cemetery

Edwin B. Hay is a public artwork by American artist Vinnie Ream, located at Rock Creek Cemetery in Washington, D.C., United States. "Edwin B. Hay" was surveyed as part of the Smithsonian's Save Outdoor Sculpture! program in 1993. It serves as the gravesite for the Hay family.

== Description ==
A bronze bust of Edwin Barret Hay with close cut hair he stares straight ahead. He wears a coat with wide lapels with an insignia on the proper left lapel and an ascot around his neck. The bust sits on a three-tiered granite base and the top tier is adorned with decorative scroll work.

The lower right side of the sculpture is inscribed: Roman Bronze Works N.Y. The lower front of the sculpture is inscribed: Hay

The front of the base is inscribed:

EDWIN BARRETT HAY
1850–1906
FLORENCE BROWN HAY
1855–1944
JULIA HAY NASH
1883–1938
HAY
A FRIEND OF ALL MANKIND
1913 GEORGE F. NASH, JR. 1991 1911 OLGA G. NASH 1982

The back of the base is inscribed:

WILLIAM JAMES HAY
1827–1903
HIS WIFE
ANN VIRGINIA HAY
1827–1901

== Gallery ==
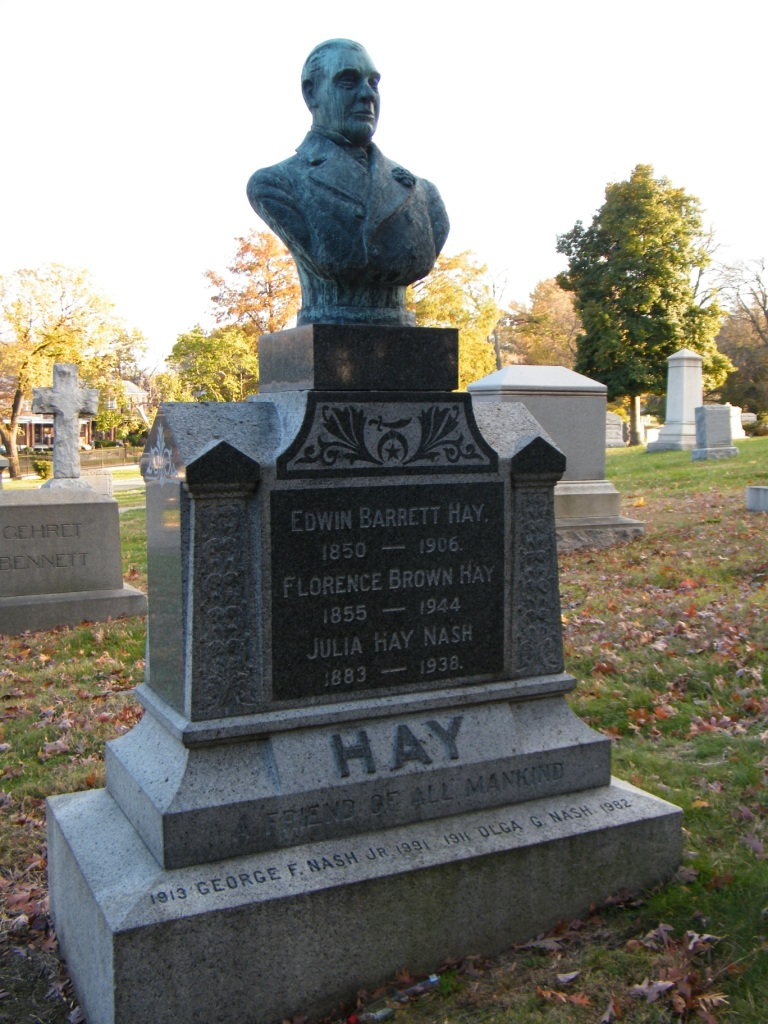
Front

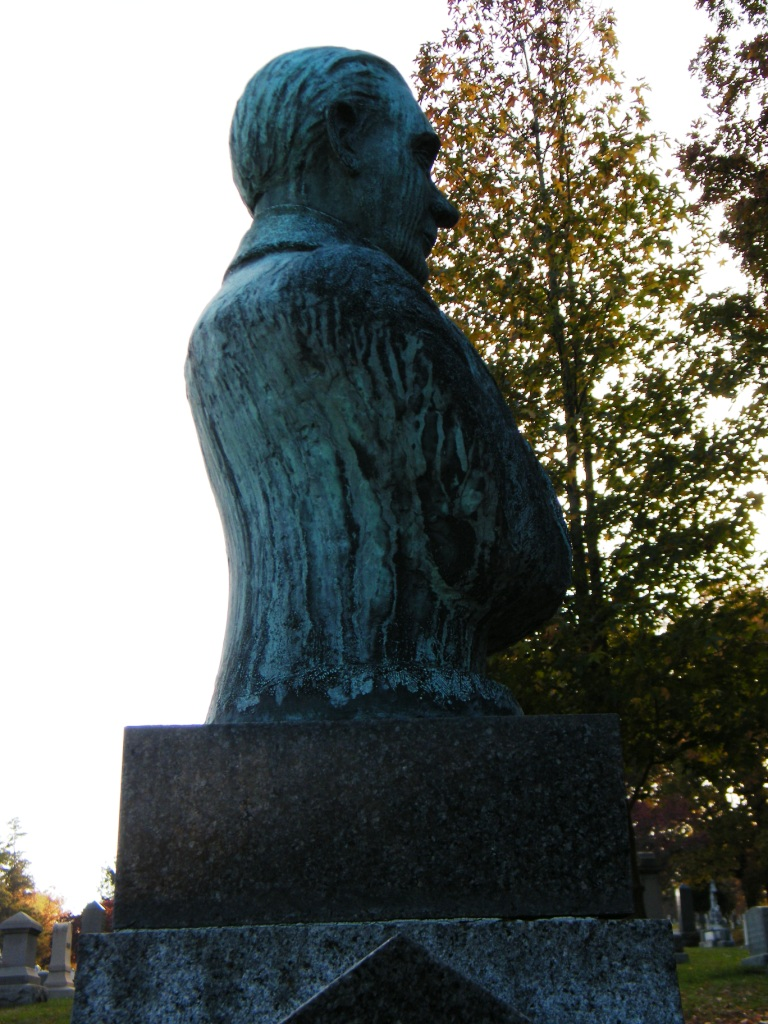
Proper Left

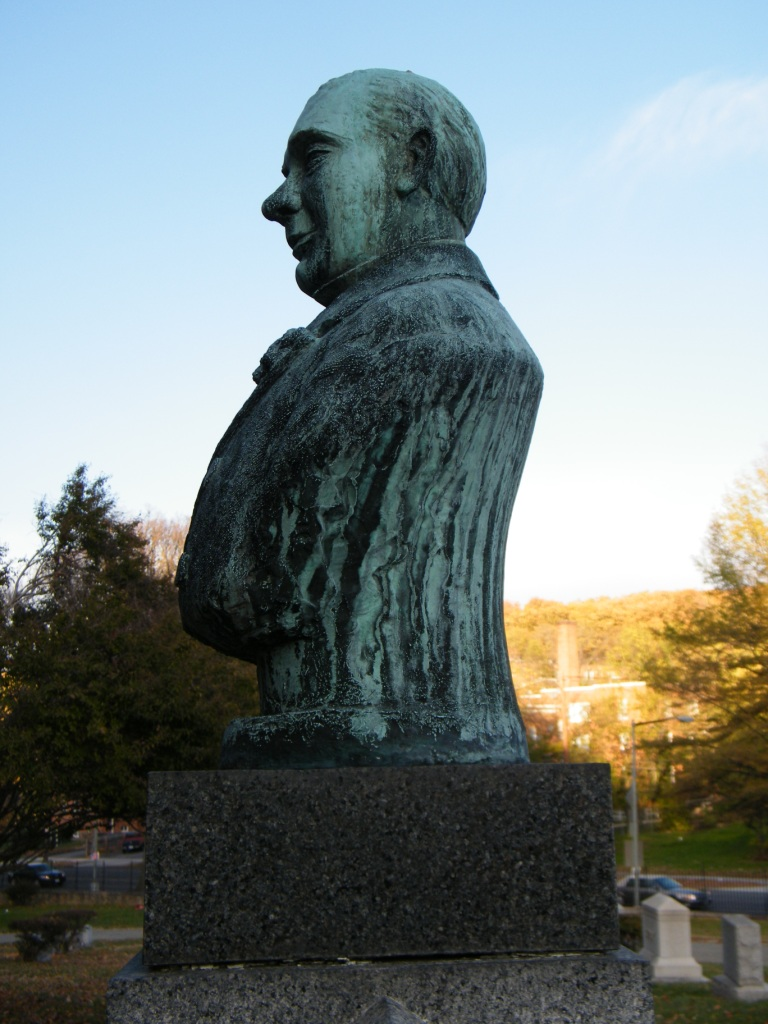
Proper Right

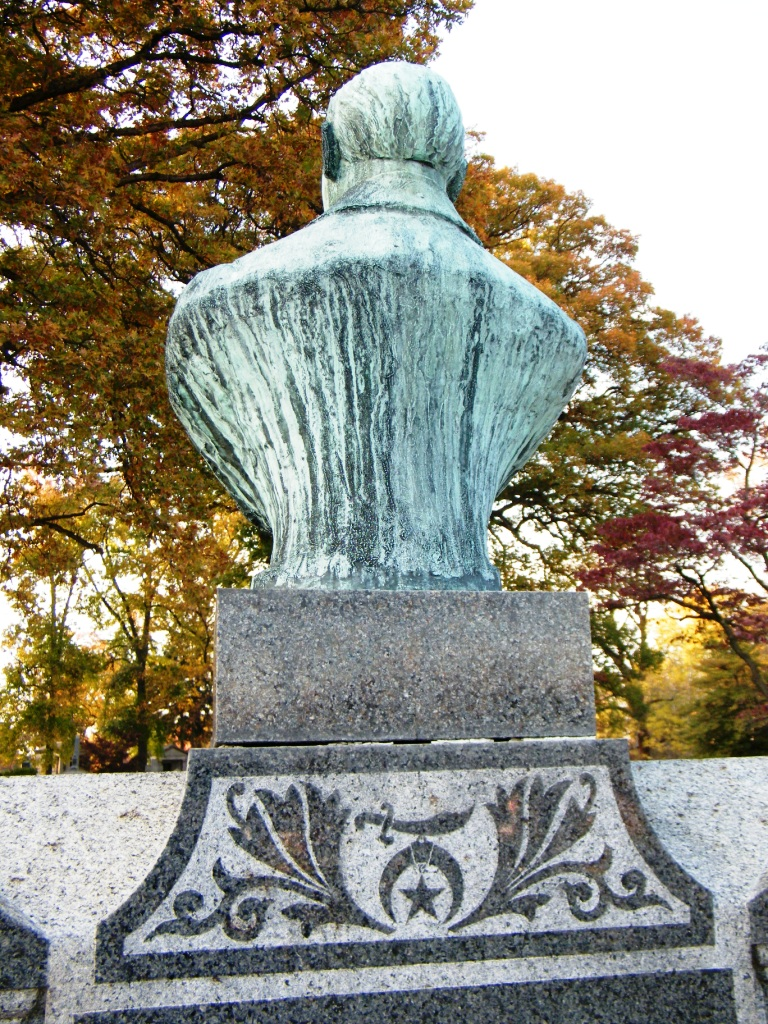
Back
