= Statue of Sequoyah =

Statue in Washington, D.C.

Sequoyah
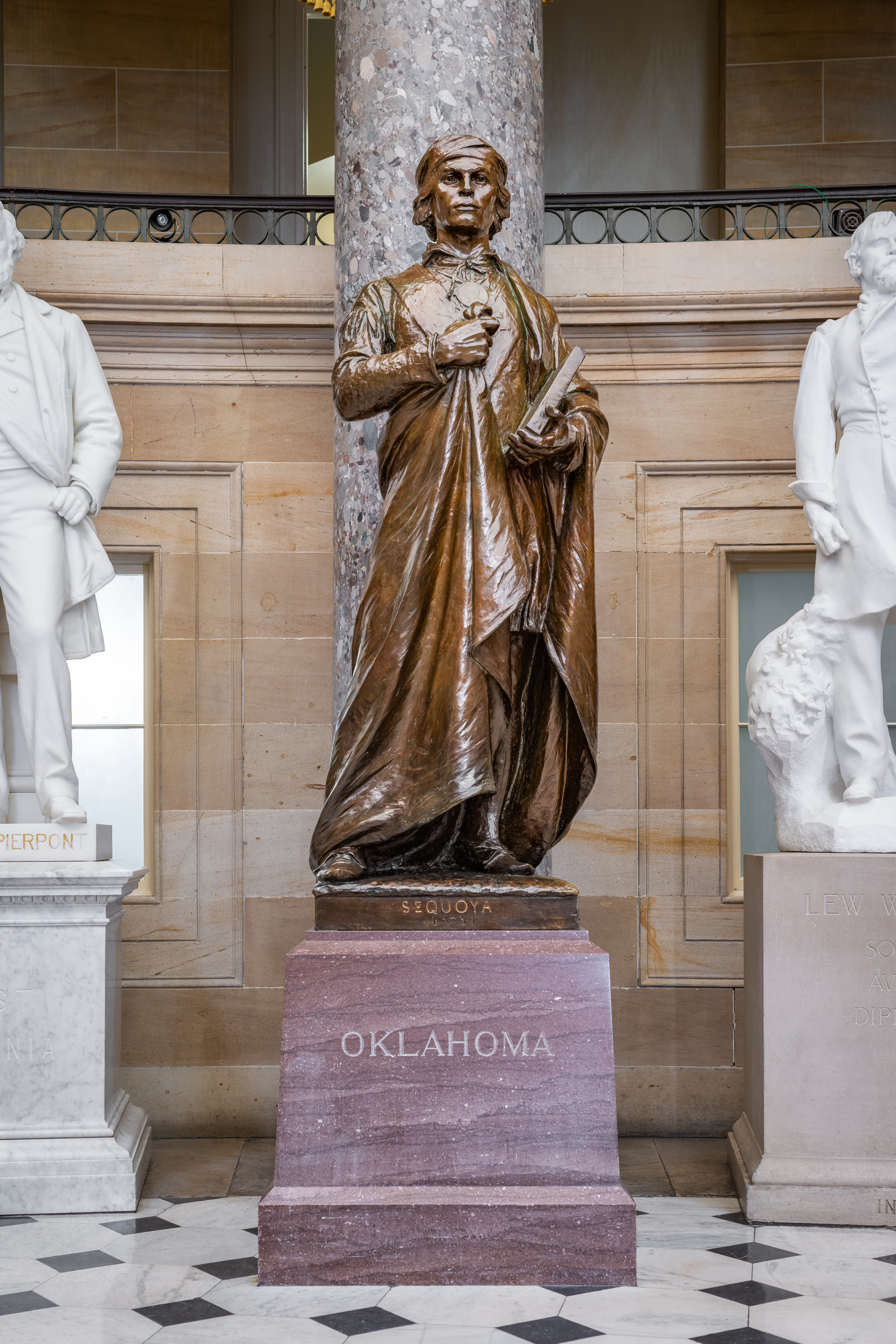
- The statue at the National Statuary Hall in 2023
- Artist: Vinnie Ream
- Medium: Bronze sculpture
- Subject: Sequoyah
- Location: Washington, D.C., United States

Sequoyah, or Sequoya, is a bronze sculpture depicting the Cherokee silversmith and inventor of the same name by Vinnie Ream (and completed by George Julian Zolnay), installed in the United States Capitol's National Statuary Hall, as part of the National Statuary Hall Collection. The statue was given by the U.S. state of Oklahoma in 1917.

== See also ==
- 1917 in art
