= Equestrian statue of George B. McClellan =

Equestrian statue in Washington, D.C.

Major General George B. McClellan
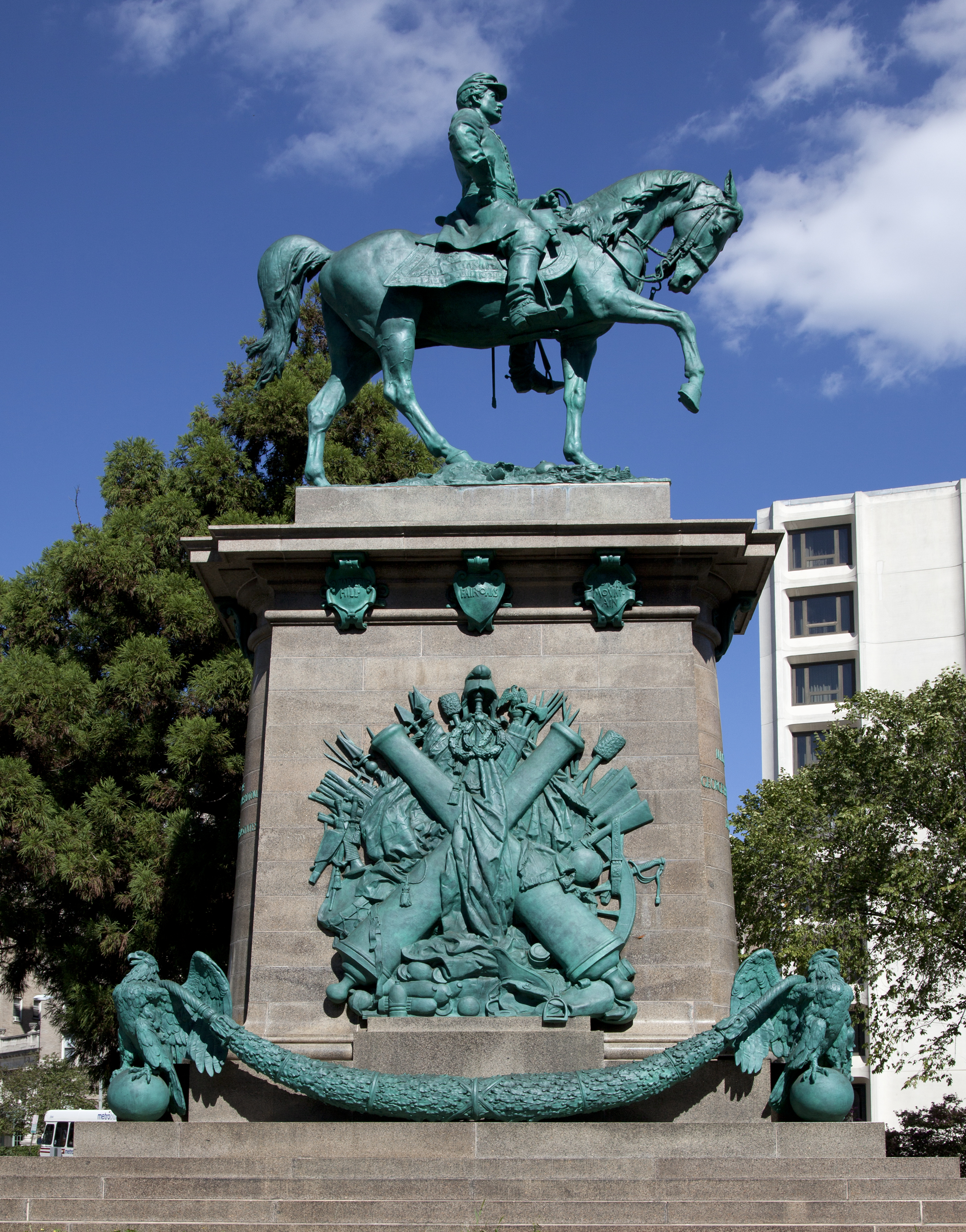
- Statue in 2010
- Interactive map of Major General George B. McClellan
- Location: Intersection of California Street, Columbia Road and Connecticut Avenue NW, Washington, D.C., United States
- Coordinates: 38.916667°N 77.046389°W
- Equestrian statue of George B. McClellan
- U.S. National Register of Historic Places
- U.S. Historic district – Contributing property
- Part of: Civil War Monuments in Washington, D.C.
- NRHP reference No.: 78000257
- Added to NRHP: September 20, 1978
- Designer: Frederick William MacMonnies (sculptor); James Crocroft (architect); Edmond Gruet Jeune {founder}
- Material: Bronze (sculpture); Granite (base)
- Length: 9.5 feet (2.9 m)
- Height: 31.6 feet (9.6 m)
- Opening date: May 2, 1907
- Dedicated to: George B. McClellan

Major General George B. McClellan is an equestrian statue in Washington, D.C. that honors politician and Civil War general George B. McClellan. The monument is sited on a prominent location in the Kalorama Triangle neighborhood due to efforts made by area residents. The statue was sculpted by American artist Frederick William MacMonnies, a graduate of the École des Beaux-Arts whose best known work is a statue of Nathan Hale in New York City. MacMonnies was chosen to design the statue following a lengthy competition organized by a statue commission, led by then Secretary of War William Howard Taft. The monument was dedicated in 1907, with prominent attendees at the ceremony including President Theodore Roosevelt, New York City mayor George B. McClellan Jr., politicians, generals and thousands of military personnel.

The sculpture is one of eighteen Civil War monuments in Washington, D.C., which were collectively listed on the National Register of Historic Places in 1978. The bronze statue, which rests on a tall granite base adorned with emblems and bronze reliefs, is surrounded by a small public park bounded by California Street, Columbia Road and Connecticut Avenue NW. The monument and park are owned and maintained by the National Park Service, a federal agency of the Interior Department.

== History ==
=== Background ===
George B. McClellan (1826–1885) rose to prominence as a major general during the Civil War who organized the Army of the Potomac. Although he was unsuccessful in early battles, the Union victory at the Battle of Antietam temporarily halted the Confederate invasion of the northern states. He was later removed from his post by President Abraham Lincoln, whom he unsuccessfully ran against in the 1864 presidential election. McClellan ran again for public office after the war, serving as the 24th Governor of New Jersey.

Shortly after McClellan's death in 1885, the Society of the Army of the Potomac, a fraternal organization consisting of Union veterans, began plans to erect a monument honoring the general. It wasn't until March 3, 1901, that Congress appropriated $50,000 for the erection of the statue of McClellan. The following month a statue commission, originally led by Secretary of War Elihu Root, Senator George P. Wetmore and General George D. Ruggles, was formed to oversee the project. An advisory committee, composed of sculptors Daniel Chester French and Augustus Saint-Gaudens, and architect Charles Follen McKim, was also formed to provide recommendations to the commission. A resolution adopted at one of the first commission meetings stated: "That the monument of Gen. McClellan be an equestrian statue, and that this resolution be communicated by the secretary to any commission hereinafter appointed to execute the work."

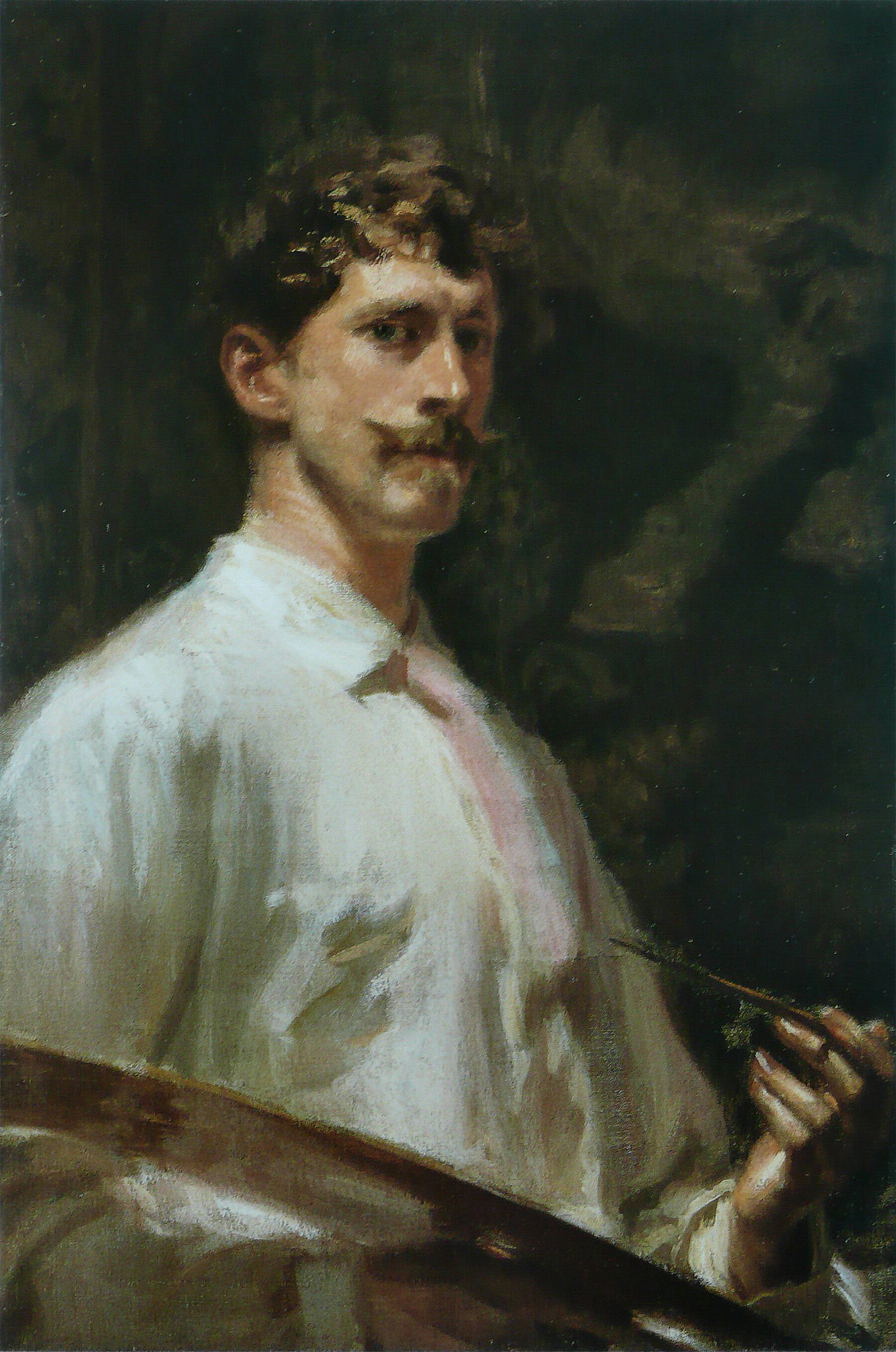
Frederick William MacMonnies, 1896 self-portrait

In 1902, a design competition was held at the Corcoran Gallery of Art with a bonus of $500 for each of the four sculptors who submitted the best models of the McClellan statue. Twenty-three designs were submitted by May 1, which was later narrowed down to four finalists: Austin Hays, Charles Henry Niehaus, Attilio Piccirilli and Thomas Waldo Story. The four sculptors were later asked to submit larger models for further review by the advisory committee. The model submitted by Story was favored by McClellan's widow, Nelly. In 1903, the committee rejected three of the designs, citing a lack of individuality and symbolism. The fourth design, by Niehaus, was reluctantly approved by the committee, though the commission rejected all of the designs stating "no model submitted upon the competition is satisfactory."

In August 1903, the commission chose Frederick William MacMonnies (1863–1937), an American artist and sculptor who lived in Paris, to create the statue. MacMonnies was a graduate of the École des Beaux-Arts who had apprenticed with Saint-Gaudens for four years beginning at the age of seventeen. His previous works included a statue of Nathan Hale in New York City, Columbian Fountain at the World's Columbian Exposition in Chicago and Bacchante and Infant Faun at the Boston Public Library. MacMonnies' other well-known Civil War work is the sculptural groupings on the Soldiers' and Sailors' Arch in Brooklyn, New York. After his initial design was rejected due to costs overruns, he submitted a new design to the committee, which was later approved by the officials and Nelly McClellan. The accepted design reflected the influence of MacMonnies' teacher in Paris, Alexandre Falguière, rather than Saint-Gaudens. James Crocroft was chosen to design the monument while the statue was founded by Edmond Gruet Jeune. The Society of the Army of the Potomac paid for the costs associated with improving the monument site.

The site chosen for the monument changed several times throughout the planning process. Suggested locations included the intersection of Florida Avenue and Massachusetts Avenue NW, Sheridan Circle (current site of the Equestrian statue of Philip Sheridan) and the intersection of N Street and Connecticut Avenue NW (current site of the Doctor John Witherspoon statue). In 1906, residents of the Kalorama Triangle neighborhood, then called Washington Heights, represented by cartoonist Clifford K. Berryman and Rear Admiral Thomas Oliver Selfridge Jr., asked the statue commission to consider placing the monument in their neighborhood. The commission, then led by Secretary of War and future President William Howard Taft, Senator Wetmore and General Horatio Collins King, approved the suggested site at the intersection of Connecticut Avenue and Columbia Road NW, describing it as a "more satisfactory and imposing" location. An additional factor that led to the site's approval was that the area had been a Union camp during the summer of 1861 when McClellan arrived in Washington, D.C.

=== Dedication ===
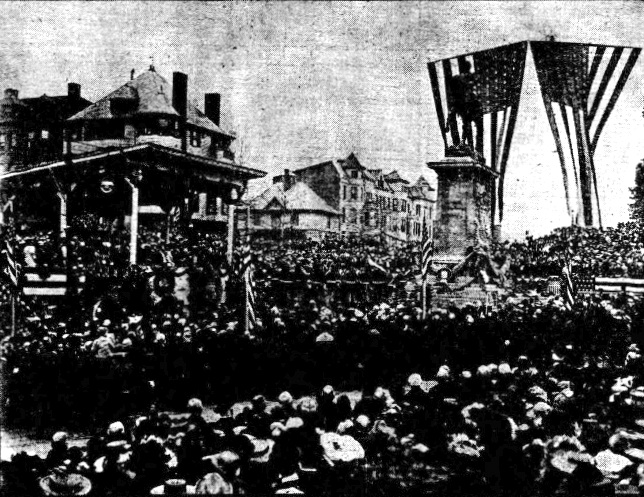
Evening Star photo of the dedication.

The dedication of the monument was first planned for October 18, 1906, to coincide with the 37th annual reunion of the Society of the Army of the Potomac. A fire at MacMonnies' polishing works prevented him from finishing the pedestal in time, so the dedication and reunion were rescheduled for the following May. During the delay, MacMonnies exhibited the statue at the 1906 Salon d'Automne in Paris before shipping it to the United States. The reunion began on May 1, 1907, with opening events held at the Belasco Theater (present site of the Howard T. Markey National Courts Building), Corcoran Gallery of Art and Thomas Jefferson Building.

The dedication took place on Thursday, May 2, at 2:30 pm. Prior to the ceremony, around 700 veterans gathered at the intersection of 18th Street and Columbia Road NW, and marched down Columbia Road in a military parade to the dedication site. Veterans who were unable to march were seated in reviewing stands. The area surrounding the monument included a temporary stand and viewing boxes decorated with bunting, large flags, flowers and shields, while the statue was draped with two American flags. Prominent attendees at the ceremony included the main speaker, President Theodore Roosevelt, New York City mayor and McClellan's son, George B. McClellan Jr., William Howard Taft, New Jersey governor Edward C. Stokes, Generals George Lewis Gillespie Jr., Frederick Dent Grant and Wallace F. Randolph, and Nelly McClellan. Additional attendees included members of Congress, foreign diplomats, members of the president's cabinet and thousands of citizens. The event was led by Brigadier General Henry C. Dwight, president of the Society of the Army of the Potomac.

Following an invocation by Episcopal bishop Henry Y. Satterlee, a brief history of the statue was given by General Horatio Collins King. McClellan Jr. then unveiled the statue to cheers and applause from the crowd. After the unveiling, the Fourth Battery of the Field Artillery saluted as "The Star-Spangled Banner" was played by the Marine Band. After a military parade consisting of thousands of troops led by General J. Franklin Bell passed the statue and the reviewing stands, the main speech by Roosevelt was given. Roosevelt's remarks, which covered various topics including war, peace, national pride and family, included the following: "Modern statuary has added a new terror to death. But I wish on behalf of those who live in the capital of the nation to express my very profound acknowledgment to those who had the good taste to choose a great sculptor to do this work. I thank them for having erected here in so well a chosen site a statue which, not only because of the man it commemorates, but because of its intrinsic worth, adds to the nobility and beauty of the capital city of the country." Following the president's remarks, an overture from Semiramide, "On the Field of Glory", was played. General Oliver O. Howard then spoke about his interactions with McClellan and General Grenville M. Dodge read a letter from General Daniel Sickles (who was ill at the time) that discussed his personal experiences with McClellan General Dwight's speech included the statement: "Statues may crumble to dust. Veterans' graves will be obliterated by time, but the grandest monument of the service of valor of the soldiers and sailors of the Civil War, the United States of America, the hope and joy of the world, consecrated to liberty by the blood and treasure of the nation, the undying testimonial of the patriotism of her people, will continue years and years." The benediction was given by William R. Jenvey, Episcopal archdeacon of Jersey City, followed by the band closing the ceremony with "My Country, 'Tis of Thee."

=== Later history ===
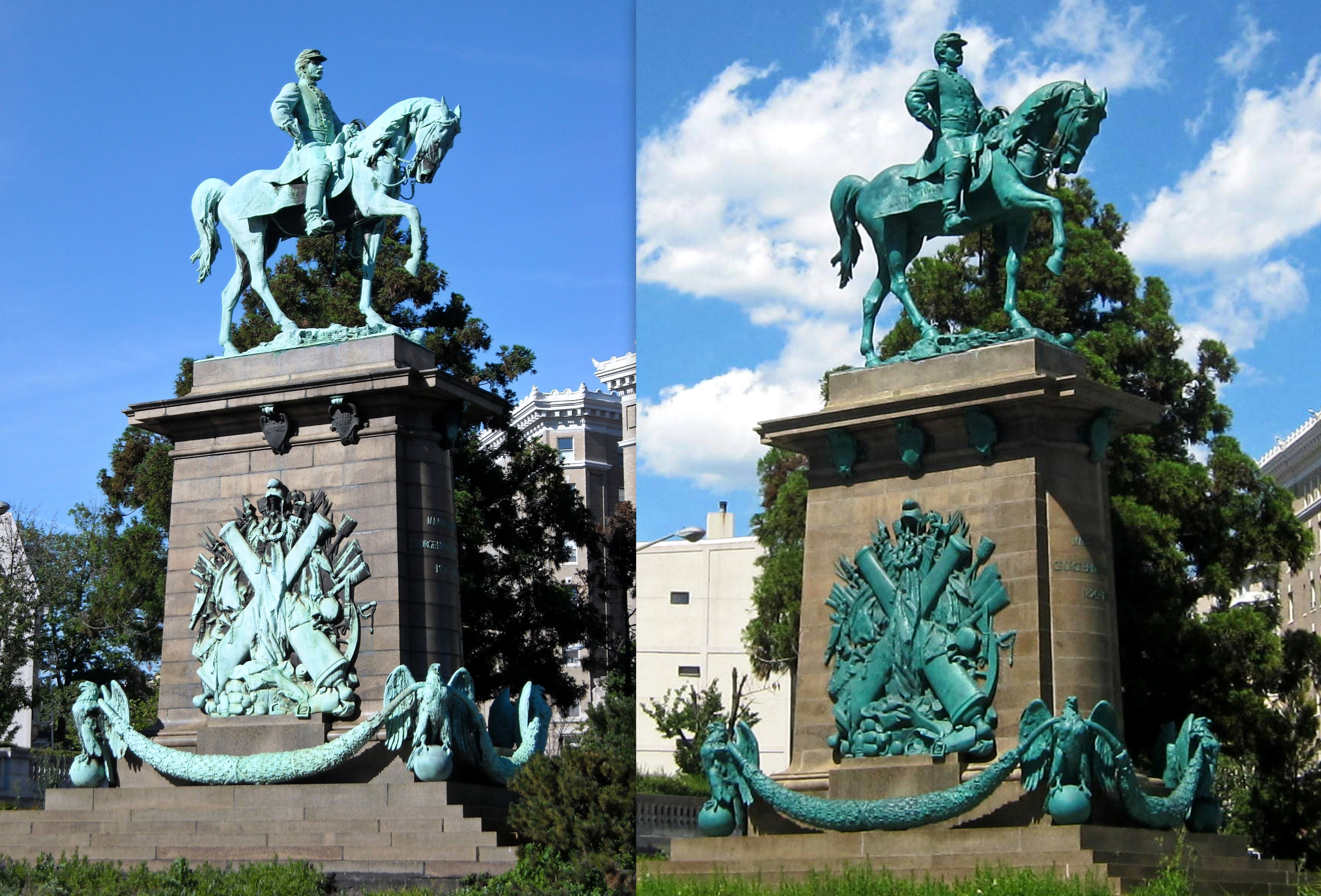
Before and after the 2009 restoration.

The statue is one of eighteen Civil War monuments in Washington, D.C. that were collectively listed on the National Register of Historic Places (NRHP) on September 20, 1978, and the District of Columbia Inventory of Historic Sites on March 3, 1979. It is also designated a contributing property to the Kalorama Triangle Historic District, listed on the NRHP on May 4, 1987. The monument and surrounding park are owned and maintained by the National Park Service (NPS), a federal agency of the Interior Department.

In 2009, the monument underwent a $114,000 restoration by Kreilick Conservation supervised by NPS architectural conservator Catherine Dewey. It was the first major conservation of the statue since its dedication in 1907. Scaffolding and nylon mesh were installed around the monument for several months during the restoration, which included cleaning, painting and waxing the statue. Damage to the monument that was repaired during the process included removing spray paint from the base, removing water leakage inside the horse's legs and stomach, and replicating a bronze shield that was missing from the pedestal.

== Design and location ==
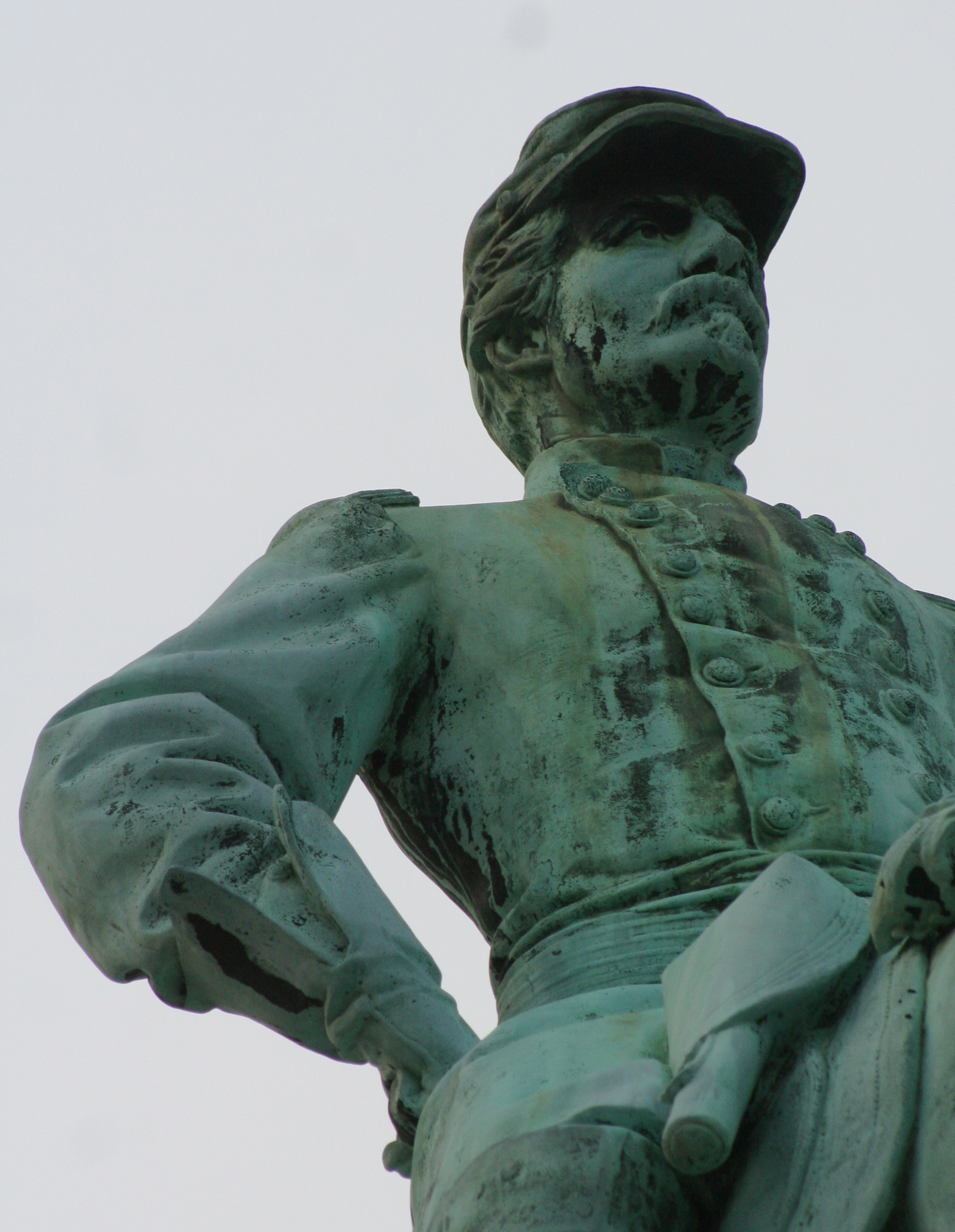
Detail of the sculpture

The monument is sited on a prominent location at the intersection of California Street, Columbia Road and Connecticut Avenue NW, on the southern edge of the Kalorama Triangle Historic District. The statue faces south down Connecticut Avenue toward Dupont Circle and downtown Washington, D.C. It is surrounded by a small public park. Adjacent landmarks include the Churchill Hotel to the west, Lothrop Mansion to the north and Washington Hilton to the east.

The bronze statue is 13.6 feet (4.1 m) tall. It depicts McClellan dressed in his Union Army military uniform, including gauntlets, a hat, sash and sword, while riding a horse. He is holding the horse's reins with the left hand while the right hand is placed on his hip. The granite pedestal, which measures 18 ft (5.5 m) tall and 9.5 ft (2.9 m) long, rests on a base measuring 44 ft (13 m) long and 30 ft (9.1 m) wide. Near the top of the pedestal are eight shield-shaped emblems noting Civil War battles McClellan led: Antietam, Fair Oaks, Gaines's Mill, Malvern Hill, Mechanicsville, South Mountain, Williamsburg and Yorktown. On the east and west sides of the pedestal are bronze reliefs composed of cannons, eagles, flags and swords. A bronze oak and laurel garland runs along the base of the pedestal between bronze eagles on each corner.

Inscriptions on the monument include the following:
(front of the pedestal) MAJOR GENERAL / GEORGE BRINTON MCCLELLAN / 1826–1885
(rear of the pedestal) ERECTED BY THE / GRAND ARMY OF THE POTOMAC / AND THE / CONGRESS OF THE VNITED STATES / 1907
(relief on proper left side) MAC MONNIES / E. GRUET JNE FONDEUR

== See also ==
- List of equestrian statues in the United States
- List of public art in Washington, D.C., Ward 2
- Outdoor sculpture in Washington, D.C.
