= Statue of Abraham Lincoln (U.S. Capitol) =

Statue in the U.S. Capitol by Vinnie Ream

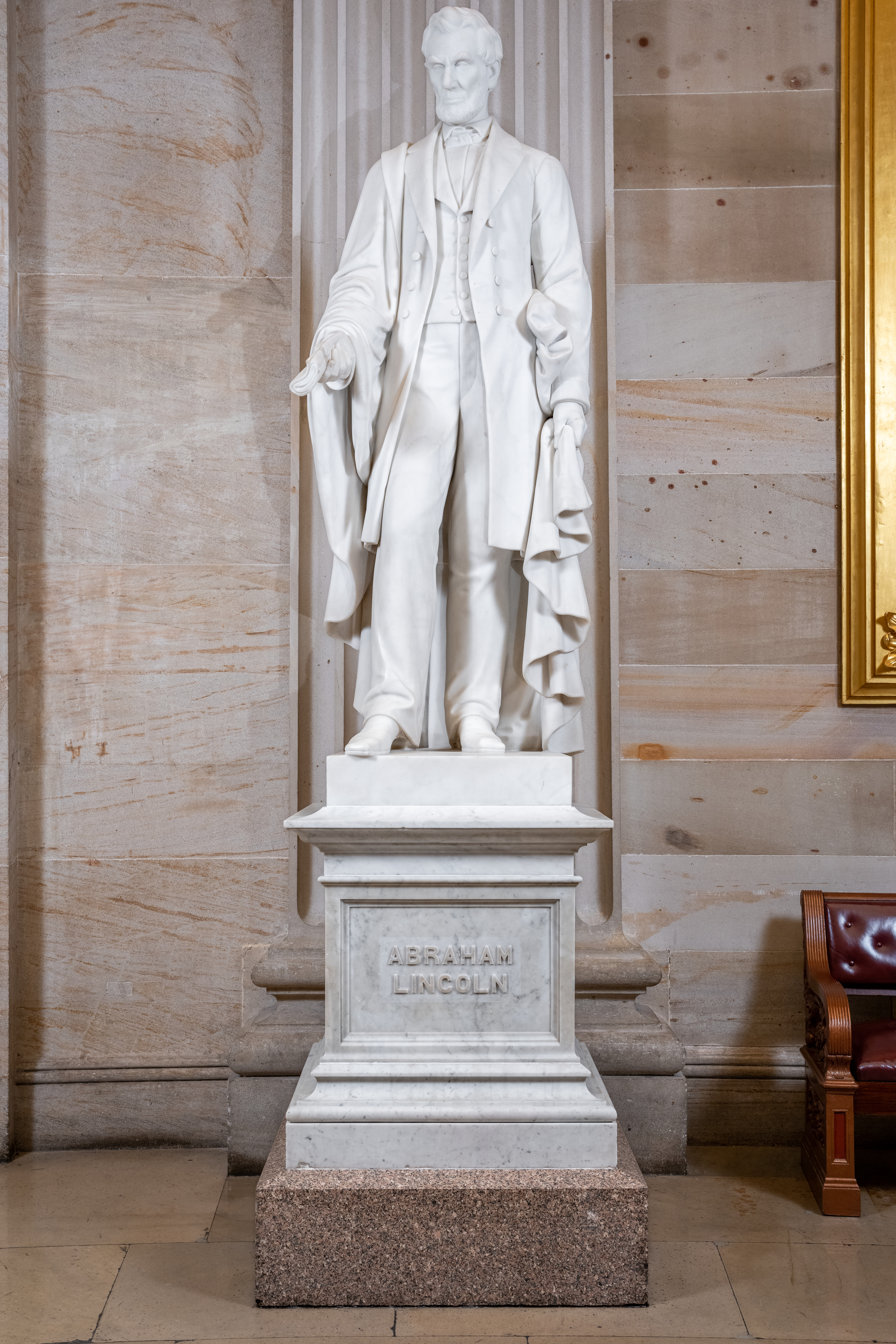
- The statue at the U.S. Capitol rotunda in 2023
- Artist: Vinnie Ream
- Completion date: 1871; 155 years ago
- Location: Washington, D.C., U.S.

The Statue of Abraham Lincoln by Vinnie Ream is installed in the United States Capitol's rotunda, in Washington, D.C. The statue was completed in 1871.

== See also ==
- List of sculptures of presidents of the United States
- List of statues of Abraham Lincoln
