= USS Terrier (1822) =

United States Navy schooner

History

United States
- Name: USS Terrier
- Namesake: Previous name retained
- Acquired: 1822
- Commissioned: Early 1823
- Fate: Sold 1825

General characteristics
- Type: Schooner
- Tonnage: 6 GRT
- Propulsion: Sails
- Armament: 3 guns

The first USS Terrier was a United States Navy schooner in commission from 1823 to 1825. It was part of the West Indies squadron and served transporting U.S. sailors, marines and supplies to the pirate infested waters of the Caribbean and was used to search out and attack pirate ships and pirate strongholds.

== Acquisition and commissioning ==
In 1822, the U.S. Navy purchased Terrier at Baltimore, Maryland, for service in Commodore David Porter's (1780–1843) "Mosquito Fleet" in conjunction with the campaign to suppress pirates in the West Indies. Outfitted at Norfolk, Virginia, during the latter part of 1822, she was commissioned sometime early in 1823 as USS Terrier with Lieutenant Robert M. Rose in command.

== Operational career ==
Terrier departed Hampton Roads, Virginia, with the other ships of Porter's squadron on 15 February 1823. The ships reached St. Thomas in the Danish West Indies on 3 March 1823 and began patrolling the coast of Puerto Rico the next day.

Terrier and the seven other shallow-draft schooners acquired at Baltimore were ideally suited to the work of exploring the coastal shallows and shoal waters of the Caribbean where the pirates were based. For the next two years, Terrier operated out of the depot Porter established at what is now Key West, Florida, and remained almost continually on station even during the two outbreaks of yellow fever – in the autumn of 1823 and the summer of 1824 – which sent the majority of the squadron's ships north to healthier latitudes. Terrier's area of concentration was the northern coasts of Cuba and Puerto Rico, where havens for the pirates abounded and the authority of the Spanish Empire – weakened by the Spanish struggle against Spain's former colonies in Central America and South America – proved almost non-existent.

Undoubtedly, Terrier participated in many of the small expeditions and skirmishes of the squadron, but there is only one documented instance of her capturing a prize. That event occurred early in 1824, when she succeeded in retaking a French ship which had been seized by pirates. Unfortunately, the pirate crew escaped ashore to Spanish territory, a refuge into which Americans could not legally pursue them. Terrier operated in the West Indies until 1825.

== Disposal ==
In 1825, a slackening in seaborne piracy enabled the U.S. Navy to begin disposing of its special-purpose, shallow-draft ships on the West Indies station. Terrier was one of the ships sold – presumably at auction – during 1825.
