= Richard L. Hoxie =

United States general

Richard Leveridge Hoxie
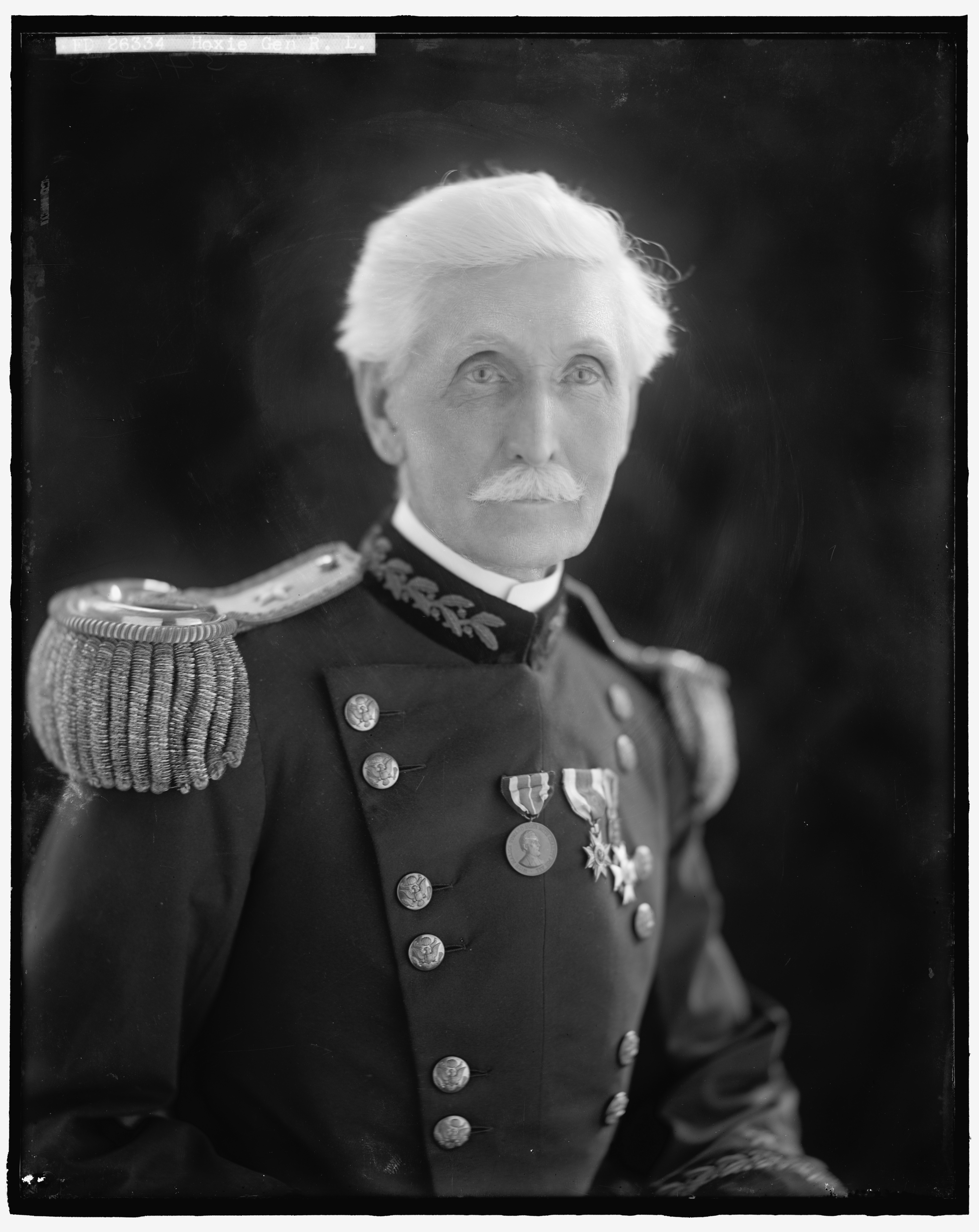
- Born: August 7, 1844; New York, New York
- Died: April 29, 1930 (aged 85) Miami, Florida
- Buried: Arlington National Cemetery
- Allegiance: United States
- Branch: Army
- Service years: 1861–1864, 1868–1908
- Rank: Brigadier general
- Spouses: Vinnie Ream (m. 1878; died 1914); Ruth Norcross (m. 1917)
- Children: 1

Richard Leveridge Hoxie (August 7, 1844 – April 29, 1930) was a brigadier general in the United States Army.

== Biography ==
Hoxie was born on August 7, 1844, in New York City. When he was nine years old, his mother died on their way to Pisa, Italy, and his father died on their return journey when their ship caught fire. In 1878 Hoxie married the noted sculptor Vinnie Ream, and they both had a son, Richard Ream Hoxie. After Vinnie Ream died in 1914, Hoxie married Ruth Norcross in 1917. He died on April 29, 1930, in Miami, Florida, Ruth survived him and died in 1959. Both Vinnie and Ruth are buried with him at Arlington National Cemetery.

== Career ==
Hoxie originally enlisted in the Union Army during the American Civil War. He served in the 1st Iowa Volunteer Infantry Regiment from 1861 until 1864. Following the war, Hoxie graduated from the United States Military Academy and was commissioned a second lieutenant in the United States Army in 1868, and retired as a brigadier general in 1908. During his time in the Army he served in the United States Army Corps of Engineers and was regarded as an expert on fortifications.
