= List of sculptures of vice presidents of the United States =

This is a list of statues and busts of vice presidents of the United States.

== John Adams ==
Image	Statue Name	Location	Date	Sculptor	Source
	John Adams	Quincy, Massachusetts	2018	Sergey Eylanbekov	
	John Adams	Bilbao, Spain	2011	Lourdes Umerez	
	John Adams	Rapid City, South Dakota 6th Street & Main Street		John Lopez	
	Bust of John Adams	Washington, D.C. United States Senate chamber	1890	Daniel Chester French	

== Aaron Burr ==
Image	Statue Name	Location	Date	Sculptor	Source
	Hamilton and Burr	New-York Historical Society			
	Bust of Aaron Burr	Washington, D.C. United States Senate chamber	1893	Jacques Jouvenal	

== George Clinton ==
Image	Statue Name	Location	Date	Sculptor	Source
	Statue of George Clinton	Washington, D.C. United States Capitol		Henry Kirke Brown	
	Bust of George Clinton	Washington, D.C. United States Senate chamber	1894	Vittorio A. Ciani	

== Elbridge Gerry ==
Image	Statue Name	Location	Date	Sculptor	Source
	Bust of Elbridge Gerry	Washington, D.C. United States Senate chamber	1892	Herbert Samuel Adams	

== Daniel D. Tompkins ==
Image	Statue Name	Location	Date	Sculptor	Source
	Daniel D. Tompkins: A Great American	New York City, New York St. Mark's Church in-the-Bowery			
	Bust of Daniel D. Tompkins	Washington, D.C. United States Senate chamber			

== John C. Calhoun ==
Image	Statue Name	Location	Date	Sculptor	Source
	John C. Calhoun Monument	Removed and currently in an undisclosed location. Formerly: Charleston, South Carolina Marion Square	1887		
	Statue of John C. Calhoun	Washington, D.C. United States Capitol	1910	Frederick Ruckstull	
	Bust of John C. Calhoun	Washington, D.C. United States Senate chamber	1896	Theodore Augustus Mills	

== Martin Van Buren ==
Image	Statue name	Location	Date	Sculptor	Source
	Martin Van Buren	Rapid City, South Dakota Mt. Rushmore Road & Main Street		Edward Hlavka	
	Statue of Martin Van Buren	Kinderhook, New York	2007	Edward Hlavka	
	Bust of Martin Van Buren	Washington, D.C. United States Senate chamber	1894	Ulric Stonewall Jackson Dunbar	

== Richard Mentor Johnson ==
Image	Statue name	Location	Date	Sculptor	Source
	Bust of Richard M. Johnson	Washington, D.C. United States Senate chamber	1895	James Paxton Voorhees	

== John Tyler ==
Image	Statue name	Location	Date	Sculptor	Source
	John Tyler	Rapid City, South Dakota Mt. Rushmore Road & St. Joseph Street		Lee Leuning and Sherri Treeby	
	John Tyler Grave	Richmond, Virginia Hollywood Cemetery	1862		
	Bust of John Tyler	Washington, D.C. United States Senate chamber	1898	William C. McCauslen	

== George M. Dallas ==
Image	Statue name	Location	Date	Sculptor	Source
	Bust of George M. Dallas	Washington, D.C. United States Senate chamber	1893	Henry Jackson Ellicott	

== Millard Fillmore ==
Image	Statue name	Location	Date	Sculptor	Source
	Millard Fillmore	Rapid City, South Dakota 9th Street & St. Joseph Street		James Van Nuys	
	Millard Fillmore	Buffalo, New York Buffalo City Hall	1930	Bryant Baker	
	Bust of Millard Fillmore	Washington, D.C. United States Senate chamber	1895	Robert Cushing	

== William R. King ==
Image	Statue name	Location	Date	Sculptor	Source
	Bust of William R. King	Washington, D.C. United States Senate chamber	1896	William C. McCauslen	

== John C. Breckinridge ==
Image	Statue name	Location	Date	Sculptor	Source
	Bust of John C. Breckinridge	Washington, D.C. United States Senate chamber	1896	James Paxton Voorhees	
	John C. Breckinridge Memorial	Lexington, Kentucky] Lexington Cemetery	1887		
	Bust of Maj. Gen. John C. Breckinridge	Vicksburg. Mississippi Vicksburg National Military Park	1913	T.A.R. Kitson	

== Hannibal Hamlin ==
Image	Statue name	Location	Date	Sculptor	Source
	Bust of Hannibal Hamlin	Washington, D.C. United States Senate chamber	1889	Franklin Bachelder Simmons	
	Statue of Hannibal Hamlin	Washington, D.C. United States Capitol	1935	Charles Tefft	
	Statue of Hannibal Hamlin	Bangor, Maine Kenduskeag Mall	1935	Charles Tefft	

== Andrew Johnson ==
Image	Statue name	Location	Date	Sculptor	Source
	Andrew Johnson	Greeneville, Tennessee Andrew Johnson National Historic Site	1995	Jim Gray	
	Andrew Johnson	Rapid City, South Dakota 6th Street & St. Joseph Street		James Van Nuys	
	Bust of Andrew Johnson	Washington, D.C. United States Senate chamber	1900	William C. McCauslen	

== Schuyler Colfax ==
Image	Statue name	Location	Date	Sculptor	Source
	Schuyler Colfax	Washington, D.C. United States Senate chamber	1897	Frances Murphy Goodwin	
	Schuyler Colfax Monument	Colfax, California Railroad Street and Grass Valley Street			
	Schuyler Colfax Memorial	Indianapolis, Indiana Indiana World War Memorial Plaza	1887	Lorado Zadoc Taft	

== Henry Wilson ==
Image	Statue name	Location	Date	Sculptor	Source
	Bust of Henry Wilson	Washington, D.C. United States Senate chamber	1885	Daniel Chester French	

== William A. Wheeler ==
Image	Statue name	Location	Date	Sculptor	Source
	Bust of William A. Wheeler	Washington, D.C. United States Senate chamber	1892	Edward Clark Potter	

== Chester A. Arthur ==
Image	Statue name	Location	Date	Sculptor	Source
	Chester Arthur	Rapid City, South Dakota 5th Street & Main Street		John Lopez	
	Chester Arthur	Schenectady, New York Union College			
	Statue of Chester A. Arthur	New York City, New York	1899	George Edwin Bissell	
	Bust of Chester A. Arthur	Washington, D.C. United States Senate chamber	1891	Augustus Saint-Gaudens	
	Chester Arthur Bust	Washington, D.C. Smithsonian American Art Museum	1883	Lot Flannery	

== Thomas A. Hendricks ==
Image	Statue name	Location	Date	Sculptor	Source
	Thomas A. Hendricks Monument	Indianapolis, Indiana Indiana Statehouse Grounds	1890	Richard Henry Park	
	Thomas A. Hendricks Bust	Washington, D.C. United States Senate chamber	1890	Ulric Stonewall Jackson Dunbar	

== Levi P. Morton ==
Image	Statue name	Location	Date	Sculptor	Source
	Levi P. Morton Bust	Washington, D.C. United States Senate chamber	1891	Frank Edwin Elwell	

== Adlai Stevenson I ==
Image	Statue name	Location	Date	Sculptor	Source
	Adlai E. Stevenson Bust	Washington, D.C. United States Senate chamber	1894	Franklin Bachelder Simmons	

== Garret Hobart ==
Image	Statue name	Location	Date	Sculptor	Source
	Garret Augustus Hobart Bust	Washington, D.C. United States Senate chamber	1901	Francis Edwin Elwell	
	Garret Augustus Hobart	Paterson, New Jersey Paterson City Hall	1903	Philip Martiny	

== Theodore Roosevelt ==
Image	Statue name	Location	Date	Sculptor	Source
	Theodore Roosevelt	Rapid City, South Dakota 9th Street & Main Street		John Lopez	
	Theodore Roosevelt Island Statue	Washington, D.C. Theodore Roosevelt Island	1967	Paul Manship	
	Theodore Roosevelt, Rough Rider	Portland, Oregon South Park Blocks	1922	Alexander Phimister Proctor	
	Equestrian Statue of Theodore Roosevelt	New York City, New York American Museum of Natural History	1939	James Earle Fraser	
	Theodore Roosevelt Bust	Washington, D.C. United States Senate chamber	1910	James Earle Fraser	
	Bust of Theodore Roosevelt	Boston, Massachusetts	1919	Gutzon Borglum	

== Charles W. Fairbanks ==
Image	Statue name	Location	Date	Sculptor	Source
	Charles W. Fairbanks Bust	Washington, D.C. United States Senate chamber	1905	Franklin Bachelder Simmons	

== James S. Sherman ==
Image	Statue name	Location	Date	Sculptor	Source
	James S. Sherman Bust	Washington, D.C. United States Senate chamber	1911	Bessie Onahotema Potter Vonnoh	

== Thomas R. Marshall ==
Image	Statue name	Location	Date	Sculptor	Source
	Thomas R. Marshall Bust	Washington, D.C. United States Senate chamber	1918	Moses A. Wainer Dykaar	

== Calvin Coolidge ==
Image	Statue name	Location	Date	Sculptor	Source
	Calvin Coolidge	Rapid City, South Dakota 5th Street & Main Street		John Lopez	
		Plymouth, Vermont Coolidge Homestead			
	Calvin Coolidge Bust	Washington, D.C. United States Senate chamber	1927	Moses A. Wainer Dykaar	

== Charles G. Dawes ==
Image	Statue name	Location	Date	Sculptor	Source
	Charles G. Dawes Bust	Washington, D.C. United States Senate chamber	1930	Jo Davidson	

== Charles Curtis ==
Image	Statue name	Location	Date	Sculptor	Source
	Charles Curtis Bust	Washington, D.C. United States Senate chamber	1934	Moses A. Wainer Dykaar	
	Charles Curtis Statue and Marker	Anadarko, Oklahoma National Hall of Fame for Famous American Indians			
	Charles Curtis	Topeka, Kansas 820 S. Kansas Avenue	2016	Elizabeth Zeller	

== John Nance Garner ==
Image	Statue name	Location	Date	Sculptor	Source
	John Nance Garner Bust	Washington, D.C. United States Senate chamber	1943	James Earle Fraser	

== Henry A. Wallace ==
Image	Statue name	Location	Date	Sculptor	Source
	Henry Wallace Memorial	San José, Costa Rica Inter-American Institute for Cooperation on Agriculture		Katherine McDevitt	
	Portrait of Henry Wallace	Washington, D.C. National Portrait Gallery		Jo Davidson	
	Henry A. Wallace Bust	Washington, D.C. United States Senate chamber	1947	Jo Davidson	

== Harry S. Truman ==
Image	Statue name	Location	Date	Sculptor	Source
	Harry S. Truman	Rapid City, South Dakota Mt. Rushmore Road & St. Joseph Street		James Michael Maher	
	Harry S. Truman	Independence, Missouri Jackson County Courthouse			
	Harry S. Truman Bust	Washington, D.C. United States Senate chamber	1947	Charles Keck	
	Harry S. Truman	Washington, D.C. United States Capitol	2022	Tom Corbin	

== Alben W. Barkley ==
Image	Statue name	Location	Date	Sculptor	Source
	Alben W. Barkley Bust	Washington, D.C. United States Senate chamber	1958	Kalervo Kallio	
	Statue of Alben W. Barkley	Frankfort, Kentucky Kentucky State Capitol	1963	Walker Hancock	

== Richard Nixon ==
Image	Statue name	Location	Date	Sculptor	Source
	Richard Nixon	Wakefield, New Zealand			
	Richard Nixon	Rapid City, South Dakota 5th Street & St. Joseph Street		Edward E. Hlavka	
	Richard M. Nixon Bust	Washington, D.C. United States Senate chamber	1966	Gualberto Rocchi	

== Lyndon B. Johnson ==
Image	Statue name	Location	Date	Sculptor	Source
	Lyndon B. Johnson	Stonewall, Texas Lyndon B. Johnson National Historical Park			
	Lyndon B. Johnson	Killeen, Texas Central Texas College			
	Lyndon B. Johnson	Rapid City, South Dakota 7th Street & Main Street		James Michael Maher	
	Lyndon Baines Johnson	San Marcos, Texas Texas State University			
	Lyndon B. Johnson Bust	Washington, D.C. United States Senate chamber	1966	Jimilu Mason	

== Hubert Humphrey ==
Image	Statue name	Location	Date	Sculptor	Source
	Hubert H. Humphrey Jr. Bust	Washington, D.C. United States Senate chamber	1982	Walker Kirkland Hancock	
	Bust of Hubert H. Humphrey	Saint Paul, Minnesota Minnesota State Capitol	1977	George Norbert Bassett	
	Hubert H. Humphrey Memorial	Saint Paul, Minnesota Minnesota State Capitol Grounds	2012	Jeff Koh-Varilla; Anna Koh-Varilla	
	Hubert H. Humphrey	Minneapolis, Minnesota Minneapolis City Hall	1989	Roger M. Brodin	
	Hubert H. Humphrey Memorial	Waverly, Minnesota Railroad Park	2005		

== Spiro Agnew ==
Image	Statue name	Location	Date	Sculptor	Source
	Spiro T. Agnew Bust	Washington, D.C. United States Senate chamber	1995	William Frederick Behrends	

== Gerald Ford ==
Image	Statue name	Location	Date	Sculptor	Source
	Gerald Ford	Rapid City, South Dakota 7th Street & St. Joseph Street		James Michael Maher	
	Gerald R. Ford	Washington, D.C. United States Capitol	2011	J. Brett Grill	
	Gerald R. Ford	Albion, Michigan Albion College	2012		
	Gerald R. Ford Bust	Washington, D.C. United States Senate chamber	1985	Walker Kirtland Hancock	

== Nelson Rockefeller ==
Image	Statue name	Location	Date	Sculptor	Source
	Nelson A. Rockefeller Bust	Washington, D.C. United States Senate chamber	1987	John Calabro	

== Walter Mondale ==
Image	Statue name	Location	Date	Sculptor	Source
	Walter F. MondaleBust	Washington, D.C. United States Senate chamber	1987	Judson R. Nelson	

== George H. W. Bush ==
Image	Statue name	Location	Date	Sculptor	Source
	George Bush Sr.	Rapid City, South Dakota 6th Street & Main Street		Edward E. Hvlaka	
	George H.W. Bush	Hampton, Virginia Hampton University			
	George H.W. Bush	Langley, Virginia CIA Headquarters			
	George H. W. Bush Bust	Washington, D.C. United States Senate chamber	1990	Walker Kirtland Hancock	
	George H. W. Bush Monument	Houston, Texas		Chas Fagan	
	George H.W. Bush	Budapest, Hungary Liberty Square	2020		
	George Bush Jr. & Sr.	Dallas, Texas George W. Bush Presidential Center	2013	Chas Fagan	
	George H. W. Bush	Berlin, Germany Embassy of the United States, Berlin	2023		

== Dan Quayle ==
Image	Statue name	Location	Date	Sculptor	Source
	J. Danforth Quayle Bust	Washington, D.C. United States Senate chamber	2002	Frederick E. Hart	

== Al Gore ==
Image	Statue name	Location	Date	Sculptor	Source
	Albert A.Gore Jr. Bust	Washington, D.C. United States Senate chamber	2017	William Frederick Behrends	

== Dick Cheney ==
Image	Statue name	Location	Date	Sculptor	Source
	Richard B. Cheney Bust	Washington, D.C. United States Senate chamber	2015	William Frederick Behrends	

== Joe Biden ==
Image	Statue name	Location	Date	Sculptor	Source
	Joe Biden	Macabebe Municipal Hall, Macabebe, Philippines	2021		

== Mike Pence ==
There are currently no sculptures or statues of Mike Pence.

== Kamala Harris ==
There are currently no sculptures or statues of Kamala Harris.

== JD Vance ==
There are currently no sculptures or statues of JD Vance.
