= United States Senate Vice Presidential Bust Collection =

Series of busts in the United States Capitol

Coordinates: 38°53′27″N 77°00′26″W

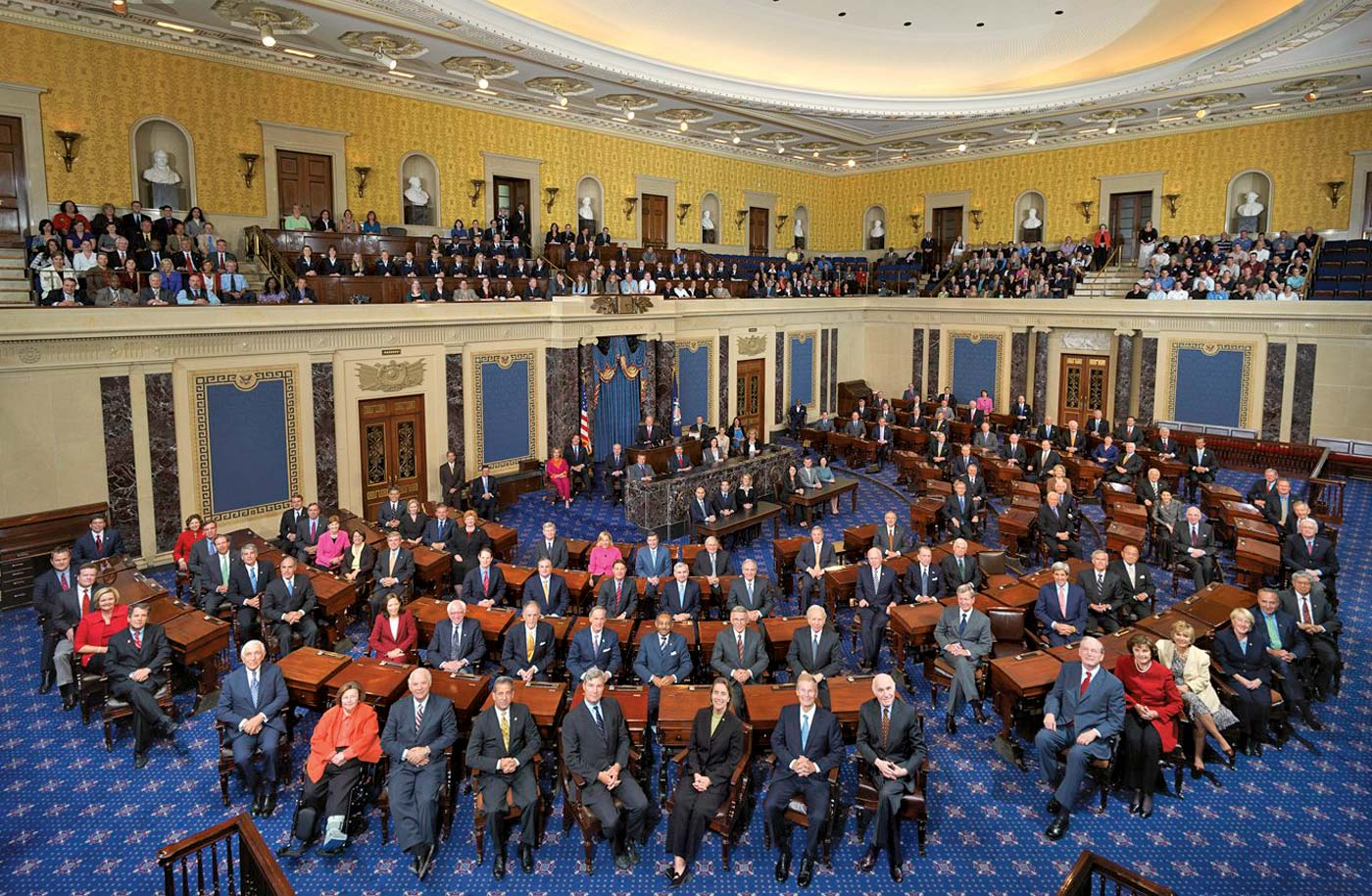
The 111th U.S. Senate inside the Senate chamber in 2009, with the busts on view in the visitors gallery.

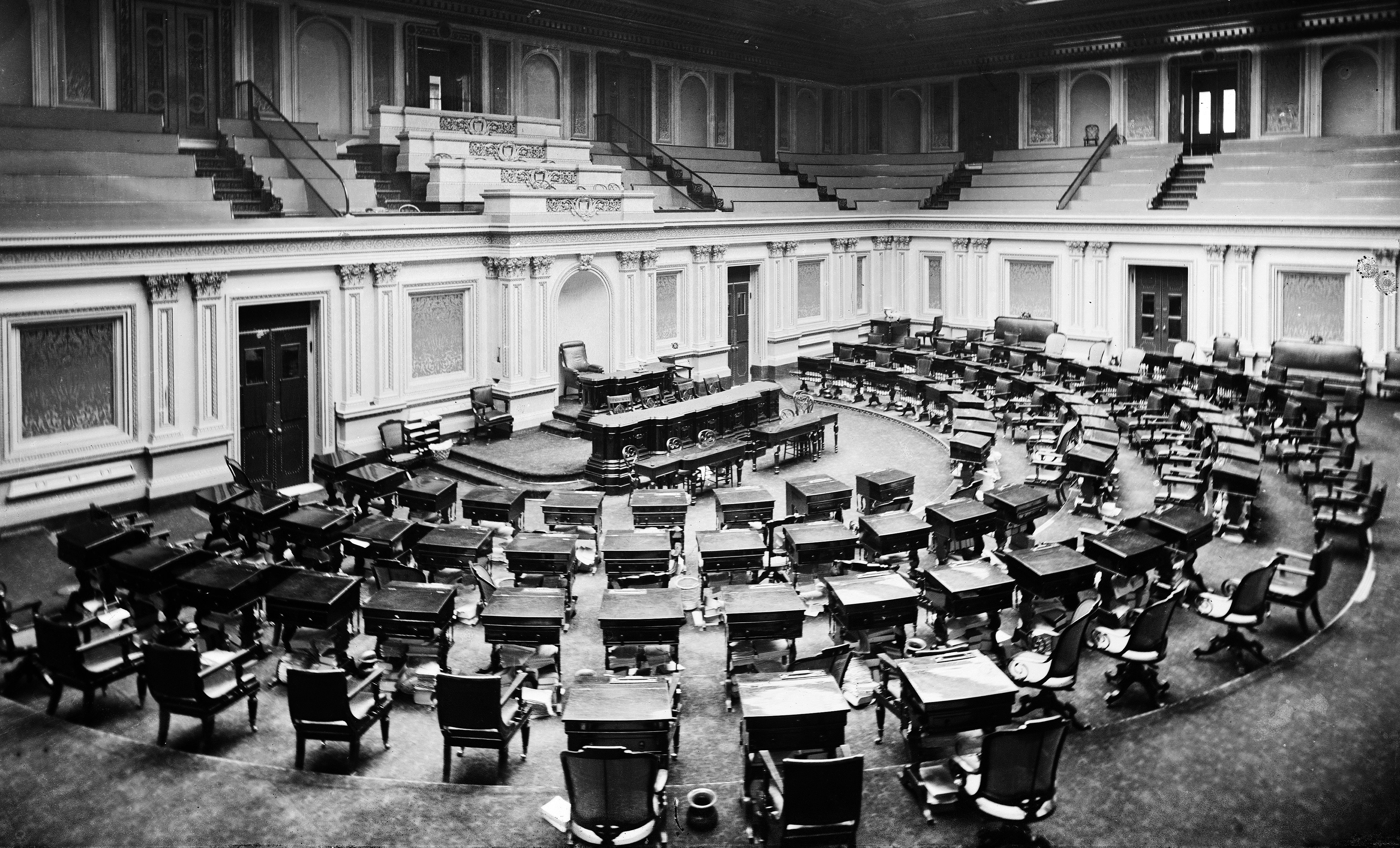
A similar view of the Senate chamber, c. 1873, that shows the empty niches where the first busts were placed.

The United States Senate Vice Presidential Bust Collection is a series of 46 busts in the United States Capitol, each one bearing the likenesses of a vice president of the United States. Each sculpture, from John Adams to Dick Cheney, honors the role of the vice president as both a member of the executive branch and as president of the Senate.

The Joint Committee on the Library, acting under a resolution of May 13, 1886, was the first to commission busts of the vice presidents to occupy the niches in the new Senate chamber. After the first 20 busts filled the niches surrounding the chamber, later additions were placed throughout the Senate wing of the Capitol.

The collection is incomplete, since the busts of former vice presidents Joe Biden, Mike Pence, and Kamala Harris are in the process of being created. The bust of JD Vance will be commissioned when he leaves office.

== List of busts ==
Vice President	Image (Note: Due to the sculptor's copyright, only images of busts carved before 1931 are included in this article, as well as busts whose sculptor died at least 70 years ago and busts that never had a copyright to begin with.)	Sculptor	Year completed	Notes
John Adams		Daniel Chester French	1890	
Thomas Jefferson		Moses Jacob Ezekiel	1888	
Aaron Burr		Jacques Jouvenal	1893	
George Clinton		Vittorio A. Ciani	1894	
Elbridge Gerry		Herbert Samuel Adams	1892	
Daniel D. Tompkins		Charles Henry Niehaus	1891	
John C. Calhoun		Theodore Augustus Mills	1896	
Martin Van Buren		Ulric Stonewall Jackson Dunbar	1894	
Richard M. Johnson		James Paxton Voorhees	1895	
John Tyler		William C. McCauslen	1898	
George M. Dallas		Henry Jackson Ellicott	1893	
Millard Fillmore		Robert Cushing	1895	
William R. King		William C. McCauslen	1896	
John C. Breckinridge		James Paxton Voorhees	1896	
Hannibal Hamlin		Franklin Bachelder Simmons	1889	
Andrew Johnson		William C. McCauslen	1900	
Schuyler Colfax		Frances Murphy Goodwin	1897	
Henry Wilson		Daniel Chester French	1885	
William A. Wheeler		Edward Clark Potter	1892	
Chester A. Arthur		Augustus Saint-Gaudens	1891	
Thomas A. Hendricks		Ulric Stonewall Jackson Dunbar	1890	
Levi P. Morton		Frank Edwin Elwell	1891	
Adlai E. Stevenson		Franklin Bachelder Simmons	1894	
Garret A. Hobart		Frank Edwin Elwell	1901	
Theodore Roosevelt		James Earle Fraser	1910	
Charles W. Fairbanks		Franklin Bachelder Simmons	1905	
James S. Sherman		Bessie Onahotema Potter Vonnoh	1911	
Thomas R. Marshall		Moses A. Wainer Dykaar	1918	
Calvin Coolidge		Moses A. Wainer Dykaar	1927	
Charles G. Dawes		Jo Davidson	1930	
Charles Curtis		Moses A. Wainer Dykaar	1934	
John N. Garner		James Earle Fraser	1943	
Henry A. Wallace		Jo Davidson	1947	
Harry S. Truman		Charles Keck	1947	
Alben W. Barkley		Kalervo Kallio	1958	
Richard M. Nixon		Gualberto Rocchi	1966	
Lyndon B. Johnson	–	Jimilu Mason	1966	
Hubert H. Humphrey		Walker Kirtland Hancock	1982	
Spiro T. Agnew	–	William Frederick Behrends	1995	
Gerald R. Ford		Walker Kirtland Hancock	1985	
Nelson A. Rockefeller		John Calabro	1987	
Walter F. Mondale		Judson R. Nelson	1987	
George H. W. Bush	–	Walker Kirtland Hancock	1990	
J. Danforth Quayle	–	Frederick E. Hart	2002	
Albert A. Gore Jr.	–	William Frederick Behrends	2017	
Richard B. Cheney	–	William Frederick Behrends	2015	
Joseph R. Biden, Jr.	Not yet commissioned			
Michael R. Pence	Not yet commissioned			
Kamala D. Harris	Not yet commissioned			
James D. Vance	Not yet commissioned			

== See also ==
- List of artwork at the United States Capitol complex
