= Louise Kidder Sparrow =

American sculptor and poet

Louise Winslow Kidder Sparrow (January 1, 1884 – July 9, 1979) was an American sculptor and a poet.

== Early life and education ==
Born in Malden, Massachusetts, Sparrow was a graduate of Emerson College, and began her artistic instruction in Europe at age 16. Sparrow's father — Wellington Parker Kidder, the inventor of the noiseless typewriter — printed her first book of poetry, entitled Lyrics and Translations, in 1904. The volume won Sparrow admittance into the Boston Authors Club.

== Career ==
Sparrow moved to Washington, D.C. around 1909 with her husband. There, she engaged in further studies in sculpture, working with Henry Kirke Bush-Brown, Edmund C. Messer, and Ulric Stonewall Jackson Dunbar. Primarily a sculptor of portrait busts, she exhibited in numerous local, national, and international exhibits. She was a member of the Society of Washington Artists and the American Artists's Professional League. Her work received a variety of honors during her career including a diploma of honor from the Paris Colonial Exposition in 1931 and a bronze medal from the 1930 exhibition of the Society of Washington Artists. Her plaster bust of Theodore E. Burton is currently in the collection of the United States Capitol; she is also represented in the collections of the Western Reserve Historical Society, the United States Military Academy, the United States Naval Observatory, the Montana State Capitol, and Howard University. Her involvement in a serious car crash in 1934 ended her sculpture career.

In the late 1920s or early-to-mid-1930s, Sparrow was hired as Editor of Translations for Star-Dust, A Journal of Poetry. She also wrote over a dozen volumes of verse, the last titled Midnight Meditation and completed shortly before her death.

== Personal life ==
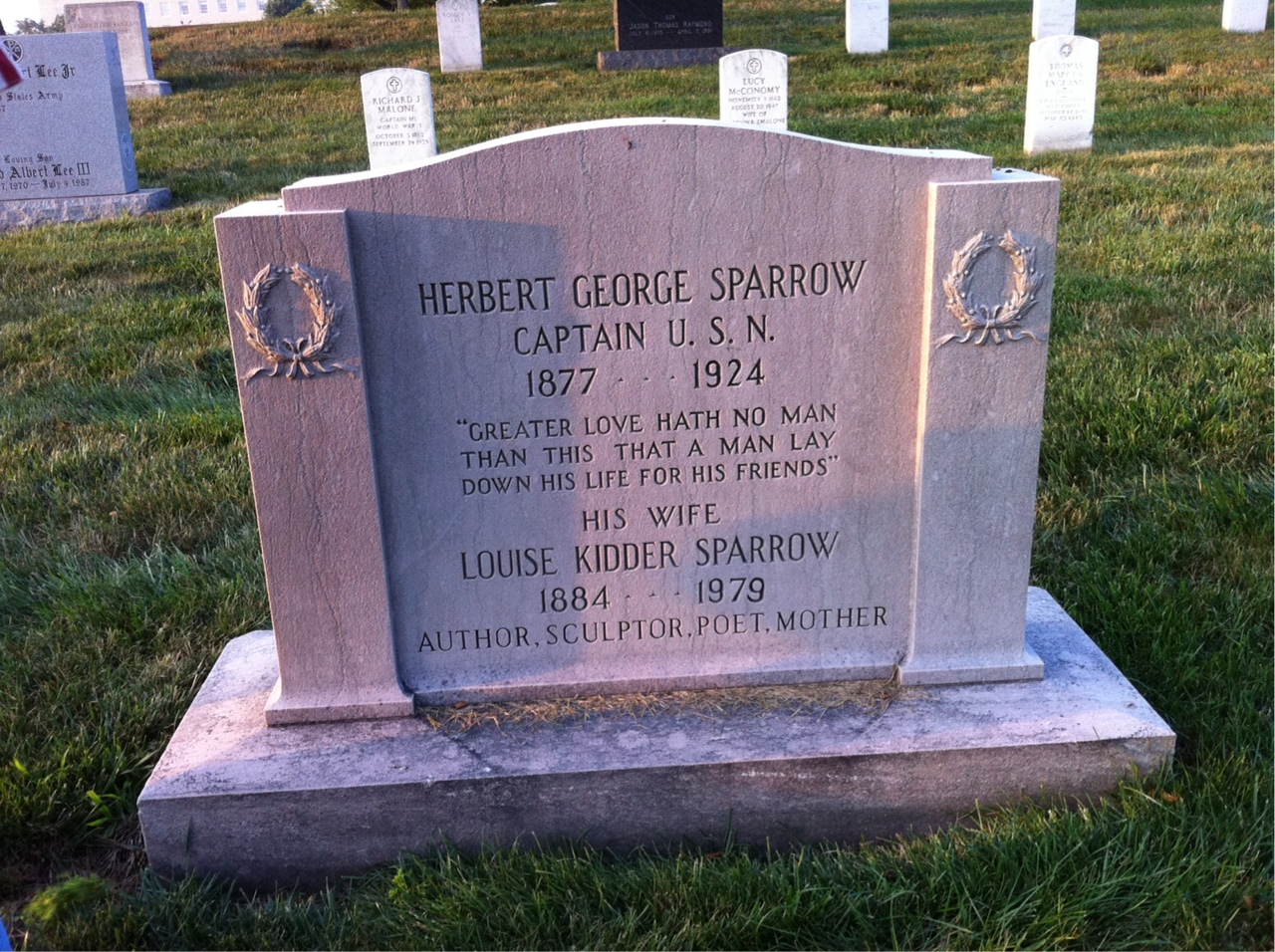
Grave of Herbert G. Sparrow and Louise Kidder Sparrow at Arlington National Cemetery

In 1909, Sparrow married Captain Herbert G. Sparrow of the United States Navy. He died in 1924 when his ship, the USS Tacoma (CL-20), ran aground in Mexico; she later wrote the book The Last Cruise about the incident. In 1910, the couple's son, Herbert G. Sparrow, was born. The younger Herbert later became a major general in the United States Army. Louise Sparrow died in 1979 at Walter Reed Army Medical Center after a myocardial infarction. She is buried with her husband at Arlington National Cemetery.

== Legacy ==
Sparrow's papers are held at the Harvard Library and National Museum of Women in the Arts. The National Museum of Women in the Arts holds a variety of Sparrow's sculpting tools.

== Published works ==
Works of Poetry

- Lyrics and Translations (privately printed, 1904)
- The Last Cruise (Stratford Co., 1926)
- My World Constitution (1938)
- Narrative Poems: from Journal in Verse (Branden Press, 1970)
- A Handful of Lyrics: from Journal in Verse (Thom Henricks Associates, 1970)
- Violets and Mimosa: from Journal in Verse (Thom Henricks Associates, 1971)
- Epic of the Sea: A Drama of Navy Life (1971)
- Spiced Herbs and Rose Petals from the Old Blue Jar (Thom Henricks Associates, 1971)
- Tales Retold at Twilight (1972)
- Basket of Pansies (1974)
- The Gentle Hours of Fresh Delights (Transcripts, 1976)
- The Steed of Bengaray (J&C Transcripts, 1976)
- Virginia Byways (n.d.)
- Midnight Meditation (n.d.)

Translations

- Tankas by Nico D. Horiguchi (Erskine MacDonald, 1925)
- Air Temple by Daigaku Horiguchi (Abrams Press, 1972)
- The Might of Wings: Poets of Many Lands (n.d.)
