= Vittorio A. Ciani =

Italian sculptor

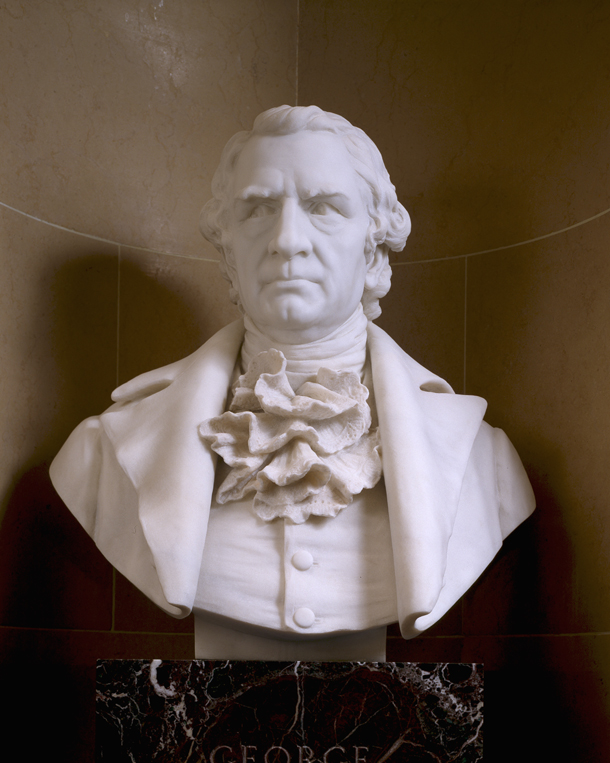
The bust of George Clinton sculpted by Vittorio A. Ciani

Vittorio A. Ciani (1858–1908) was a sculptor.

Ciani is known for sculpting the bust of George Clinton in the United States Senate Vice Presidential Bust Collection.

== Life and career ==
Ciani was an Italian citizen who had a studio in New York City.

Ciani received the commission for a marble bust of Vice President George Clinton under authority of a Senate resolution approved in 1886. Ciani based his work on the best-known likeness of the vice president: an oil on canvas portrait by Ezra Ames. In December 1893, Ciani wrote Architect of the Capitol Edward Clark that he had completed the clay study model. The finished work, in marble, was installed in the Senate Chamber in 1894 as part of the Vice Presidential Bust Collection.

A marble sculpture of Austin Corbin by Ciani is in a collection at the National Portrait Gallery. Other sculptures by Ciani are located at Grace Church, Columbia College, and The Breakers.

In 1897, Ciani was awarded the Grand Cross of the Crown of Italy by King Umberto I of Italy for historic merit.

In 1898, an article about Ciani and his studio has published in the magazine Form.
