= Charles Tefft =

American sculptor

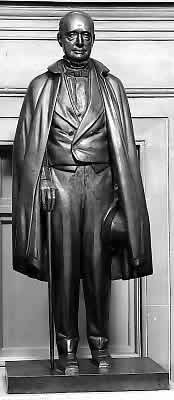
Hannibal Hamlin, National Statuary Hall Collection, US Capitol, Washington D.C.

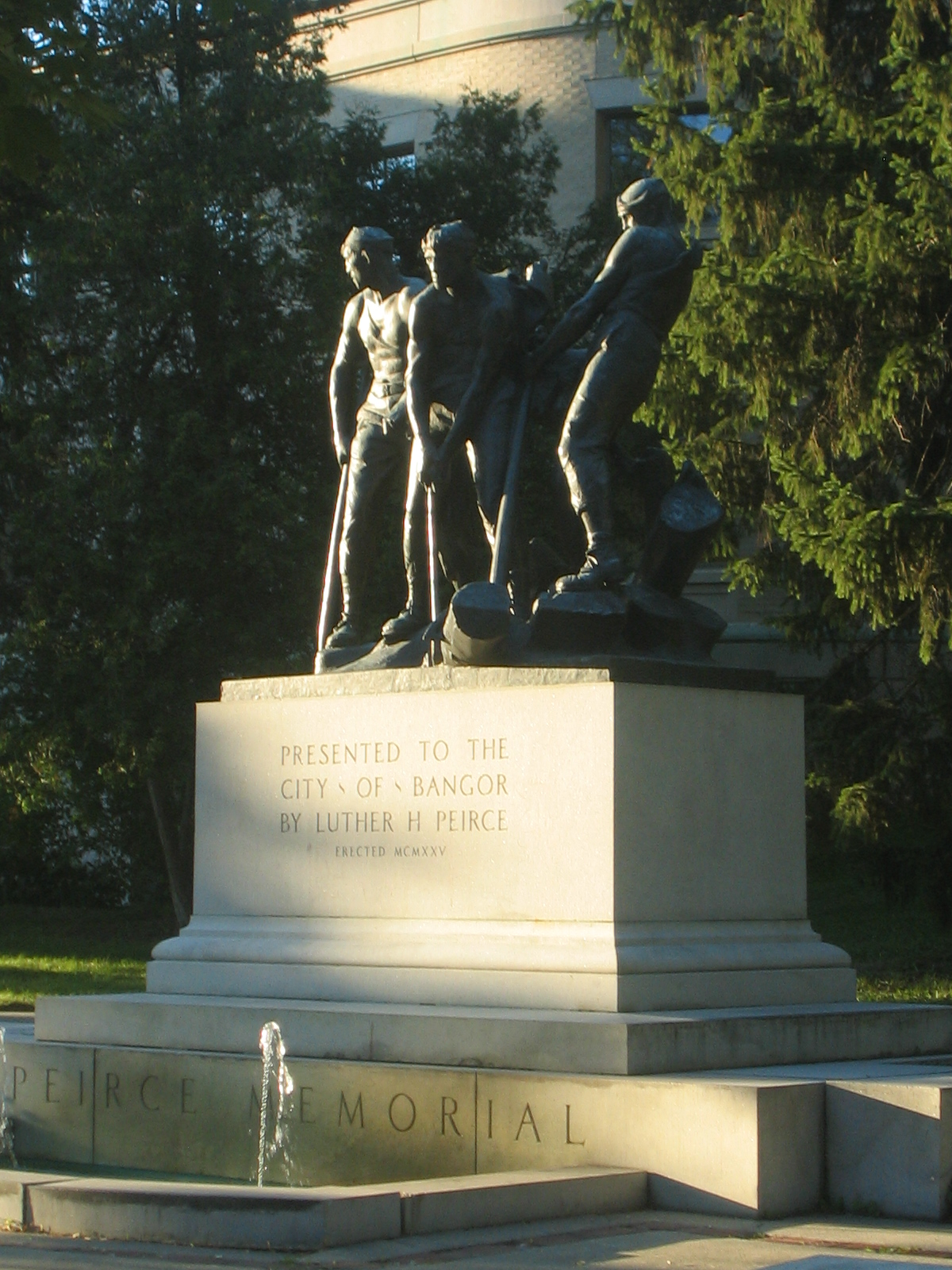
Luther Peirce Memorial, Bangor Maine

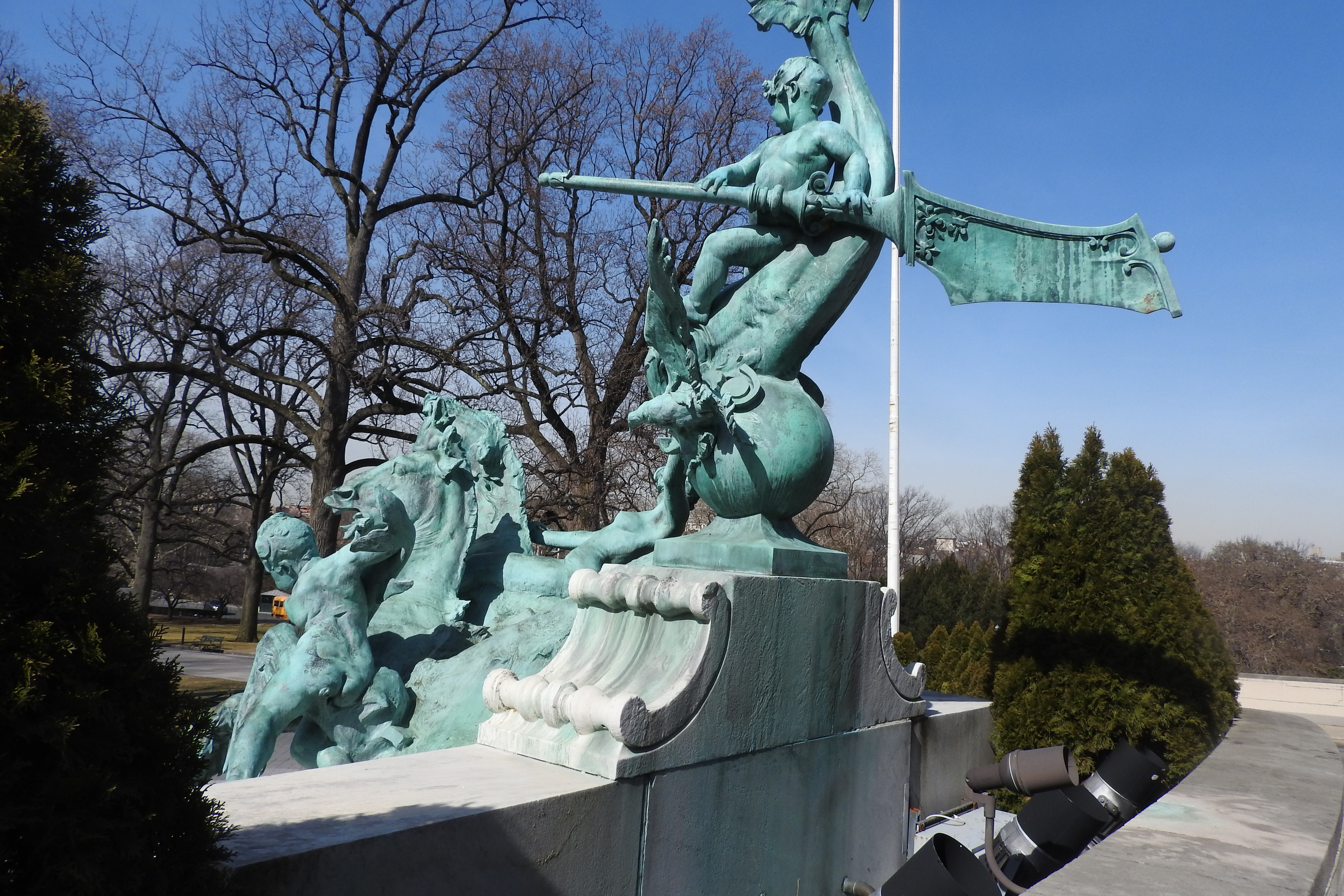
Fountain of Life, Bronx

Charles (or Carl) Eugene Tefft (September 22, 1874 – September 20, 1951) was an American sculptor born in Brewer, Maine. His statue of Hannibal Hamlin is one of Maine's two statues in the National Statuary Hall Collection located in the US Capitol in Washington D.C. A second Tefft statue of Hamlin stands in Norumbega Mall (a public park) in downtown Bangor, Maine.

He studied sculpture with Frederick Ruckstull at the Artist-Artisan Institute in New York City. He also taught there. He worked for a while as an apprentice to John Quincy Adams Ward.

He set up his own studio in Tompkinsville, New York, and later in Guilford, Maine.

As with many sculptors of his generation, Tefft produced architectural sculpture, most notably a figure Renaissance Art, for Cass Gilbert's Saint Louis Art Museum in St. Louis, Missouri.

Tefft was chosen as the director of sculpture at the Sesquicentennial Exposition held in Philadelphia in 1926.

He died in Presque Isle, Maine on September 20, 1951.

== Works ==
- Renaissance Art, Saint Louis Art Museum St. Louis, Missouri, ca. 1904.
- Fountain of Life, New York Botanical Garden, Bronx, New York, 1905
- Luther Peirce Memorial, Bangor, Maine, 1926
- Hannibal Hamlin, National Statuary Hall Collection located in the US Capitol in Washington D.C., 1935.
- Hannibal Hamlin, Norumbega Mall (public park), Bangor, Maine
- One of the figures, or a study for one of the figures, from the Luther Peirce Memorial named River Driver was cast separately and placed in Brookgreen Gardens, Murrells Inlet, South Carolina in 1950
- Victory, World War I memorial, Belleville, New Jersey, 1922
