= Theodore Augustus Mills =

American sculptor

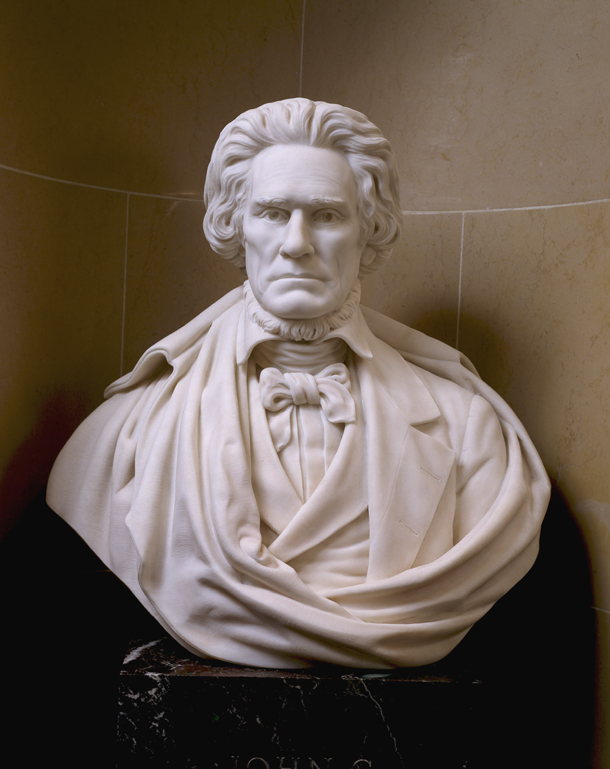
The bust of John C. Calhoun sculpted by Theodore Augustus Mills

Theodore Augustus Mills (April 24, 1839 – 1916) was an American sculptor. He is known for sculpting the bust of John C. Calhoun in the United States Senate Vice Presidential Bust Collection.

== Life and career ==
Theodore Augustus Mills was born on April 24, 1839, in Charleston, South Carolina. In 1860, Mills became a student at the Royal Academy of Fine Arts in Munich, Germany.

Theodore Mills was the son of the noted sculptor Clark Mills, who was renowned for his bronze equestrian statue of Andrew Jackson in Lafayette Square, Washington, D.C. Completed in 1853, it was the first equestrian statue erected in the United States, as well as the first bronze sculpture made in this country. Clark Mills established his foundry in Maryland, where he later cast Thomas Crawford's Statue of Freedom for the U.S. Capitol dome. Both Theodore and his brother, Theophilus, assisted their father in his projects, and both became sculptors in their own right.

In the 1840s in South Carolina, Clark Mills developed a method of using life casts from the faces of his sitters to simplify the production of portrait busts. His 1846 bust of John C. Calhoun, purchased by the city of Charleston and at that time considered the best likeness of Calhoun, was made from such a life mask. That mask was used 40 years later by his son Theodore, who actively petitioned the Joint Committee on the Library for the commission of the Senate's official vice presidential bust of Calhoun. Theodore Mills having been born in South Carolina was in his favor, because attempts were traditionally made to choose a sculptor from each vice president's native state. Mills submitted a plaster model and earned the commission in 1895.

Theodore Mills's likeness of Calhoun shows him as slightly gaunt, but there is no sign of the tuberculosis that ravaged the statesman in his last years. The face is most memorable for the deeply drilled eyes, which seem to express somber preoccupation. The resolute head, strongly symmetrical, appears almost to sit on the luxuriant roll of whiskers that lies beneath the jaw. The costume of shirt, cravat, waistcoat, and topcoat is encircled and partly overlaid by a cloak whose heavy folds lend an air of classical gravitas to the bust. Beyond the verifiable likeness and brooding quality, however, Mills adds little to suggest the powerfully conflicting characteristics of this controversial figure who played such a central role in 19th-century American history.

Theodore Mills and his father also modeled a life mask of Abraham Lincoln just 60 days before the president was assassinated in 1865. That mask was eventually donated to the Carnegie Museum of Natural History in Pittsburgh by Theodore Mills, then a preparator in the museum's exhibits department. Already known for his Native American groups, the artist was hired in 1898 to create similar figures for the Pittsburgh museum.

== Death and legacy ==
Mills died in 1916 in Pittsburgh, Pennsylvania. He has an entry in the Benezit Dictionary of Artists.

Sculptures of Joseph Francis and Joseph Henry sculpted by Mills are held at the Smithsonian American Art Museum.
