= John Calabro =

American sculptor

John Calabro (1914–1994) was an American artist and sculptor who has created coins, medals, plaques, busts, statutes and heroic-size works of famous events and notable figures from the world of politics, sports and entertainment. Calabro was commissioned by the Rockefeller family to create the bust of former Vice President Nelson Rockefeller for the United States Senate Vice Presidential Bust Collection.

== Background ==
Born in New York City on May 8, 1914, Calabro came from a family of sculptors and artists. Educated at the Cooper Union in New York City, Calabro did further studies at Milan's Academy of Fine Arts. He studied with Gaetano Cecere and did an apprenticeship with a firm in Newark, New Jersey.

Calabro moved from Demarest, New Jersey to nearby Northvale in 1964 to a custom-designed home with a studio equipped with skylights, which enabled natural light to fill the space and allow the artist to see fine details and shadows over the course of the day. The studio was used to complete all but his largest works of art.

The family of former Vice President of the United States Nelson Rockefeller specifically requested that Calabro be chosen to execute a bust of Rockefeller for exhibit and donated additional funds to cover the costs of the work. Issues were raised by Architect of the Capitol George M. White about what was perceived as a "definite lack of personality" in Calabro's work and Vincent Palumbo was given the job by White of creating a finished marble bust based on the plaster model created by Calabro. Both artists attended the ceremonies held on June 1, 1987, where the bust, a youthful depiction of Rockefeller, was put on formal display at the Capitol as part of the United States Senate Vice Presidential Bust Collection.

Abraham Lincoln was a favorite subject of Calabro's, as he was drawn to the president's "humble birth" and "great ambition". Works Calabro created depicting Lincoln, created using a favorite photo taken during the 1860 presidential race, include a bust put on display at the Library of Presidential Papers (now known as the Center for the Study of the Presidency and Congress) as well as a 1948 larger-than-life statue of Lincoln on display in Fort Wayne, Indiana. Among more recent presidents, Calabro created medals crafted of bronze and silver depicting Richard Nixon's resignation and the succeeding Inauguration of Gerald Ford. Medals of Louis Armstrong and William C. Handy that he created on behalf of the American Negro Commemorative Society were put on display at Texas Southern University in February 1971.

In 1968, Calabro created a medal of Babe Ruth for the National Commemorative Society, created after studying numerous pictures of the baseball player. The medal was struck by the Franklin Mint in silver, in addition to a single example minted for the Smithsonian Institution in platinum.
