= Kalervo Kallio =

Finnish sculptor

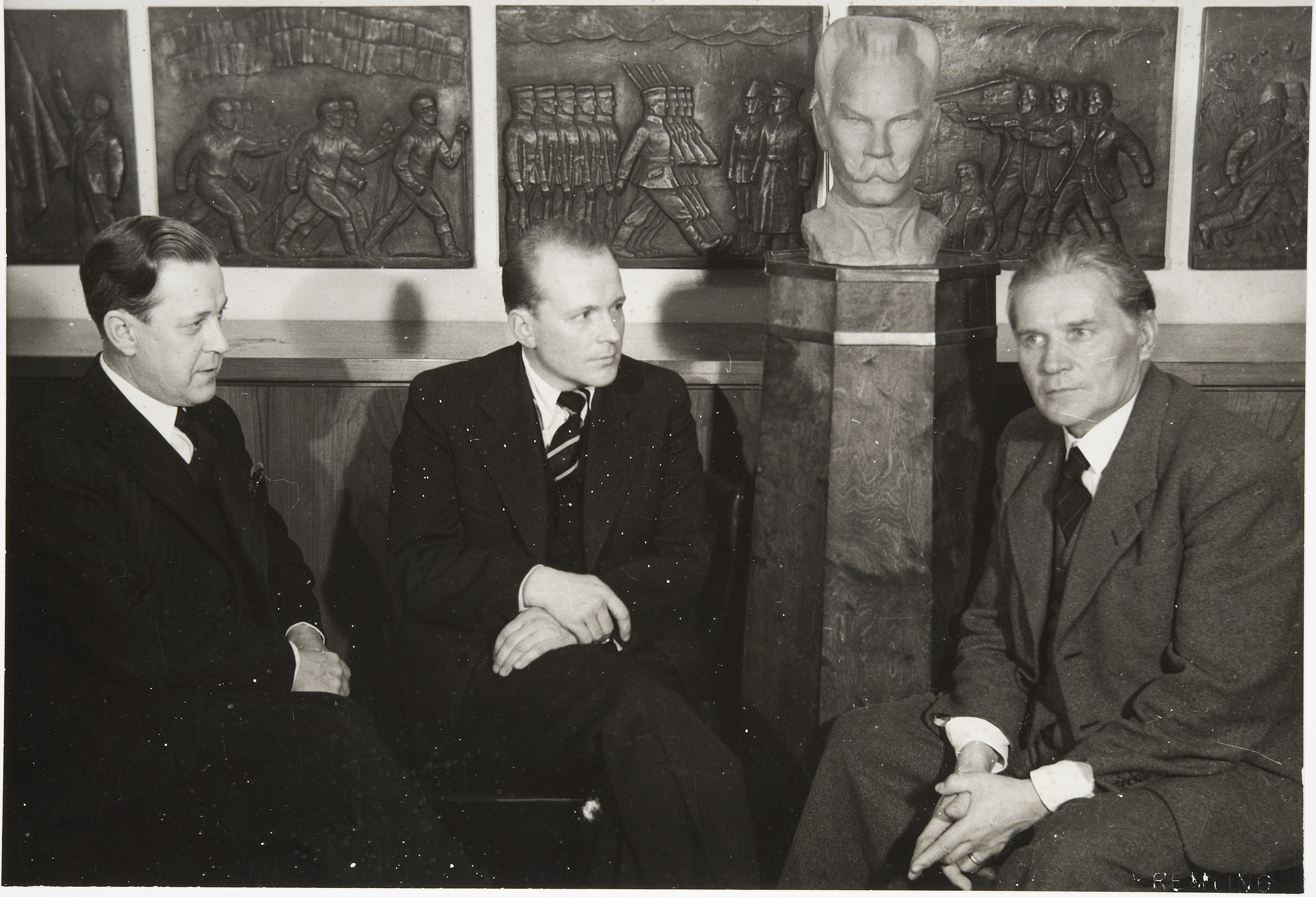
- Kaarlo Marjanen, Kalervo Kallio and Einari Vuorela in 1944.
- Born: Niilo Kalervo Kallio; 28 March 1909; Nivala, Grand Duchy of Finland
- Died: 2 November 1969 (aged 60); Helsinki, Finland
- Occupation: Sculptor

Niilo Kalervo Kallio (28 March 1909 – 2 November 1969) was a Finnish sculptor. He was the son of the fourth president of Finland, Kyösti Kallio.

Kallio's most famous works are the memorial statue of his father, located in Helsinki, and the bust of the 35th vice president of the United States Alben W. Barkley. The bust is placed at the United States Senate Vice Presidential Bust Collection in Washington, D.C.

== Famous works ==
- Leevi Madetoja grave memorial, Hietaniemi cemetery, Helsinki (1955)
- Jätkänpatsas, Rovaniemi (1955)
- Bust of Alben W. Barkley, United States Senate Vice Presidential Bust Collection, Washington, D.C. (1958)
- Kyösti Kallio memorial, Helsinki (1962)
- The Javelin Thrower, Pori Stadium, Pori (1966)
- Statue of Carl Gustaf Emil Mannerheim, Mikkeli (1967)
