= Statue of Hannibal Hamlin =

Statue in the U.S. Capitol

Hannibal Hamlin
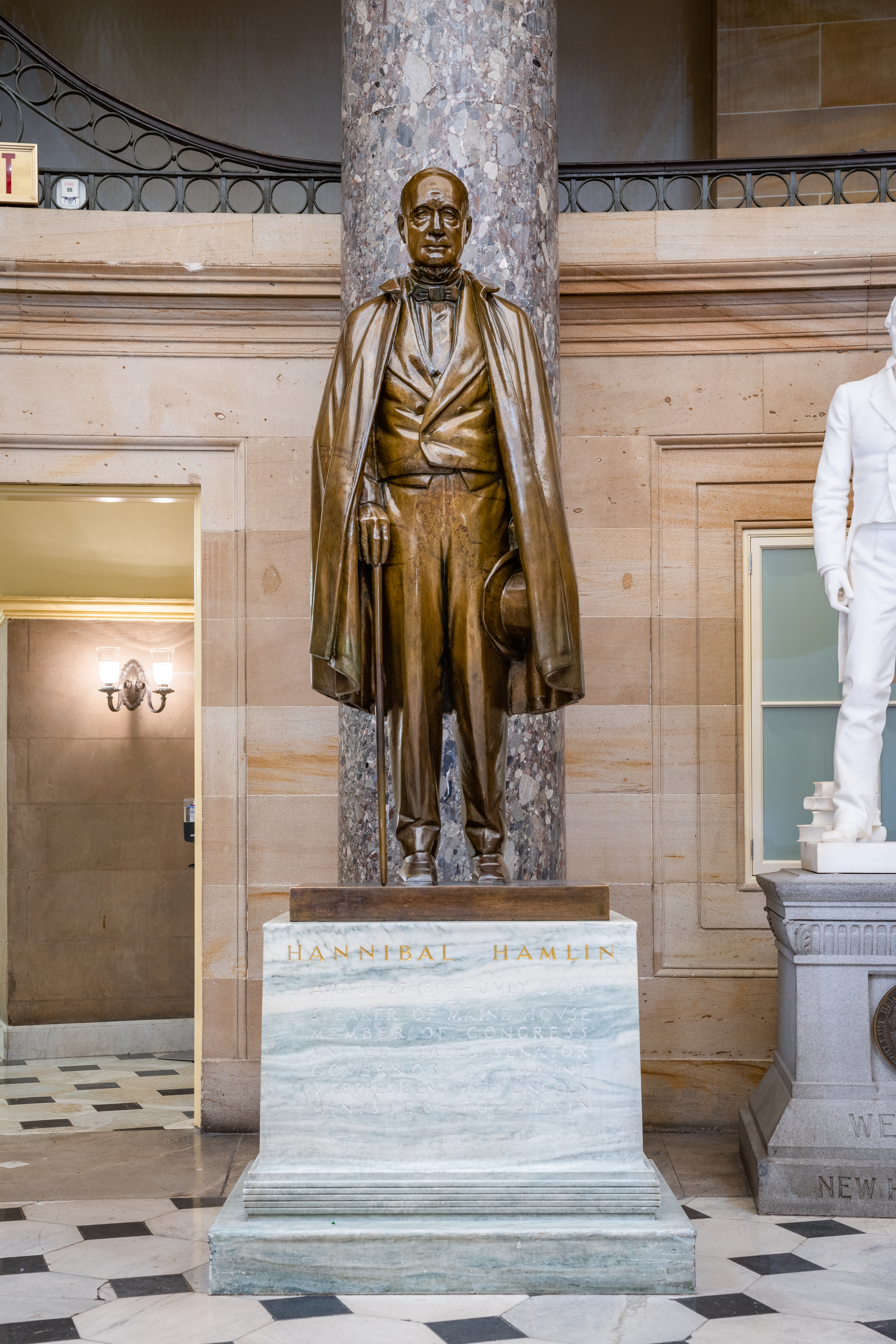
- The statue in the National Statuary Hall in 2023
- Artist: Charles Tefft
- Medium: Bronze sculpture
- Subject: Hannibal Hamlin
- Location: Washington, D.C., United States

Hannibal Hamlin is a bronze sculpture depicting the American attorney and politician of the same name by Charles Tefft, installed at the United States Capitol's National Statuary Hall, in Washington, D.C., as part of the National Statuary Hall Collection. The statue was gifted by the U.S. state of Maine in 1935.

== See also ==
- 1935 in art
