= Ulric Dunbar =

Canadian-born American sculptor

Ulric Stonewall Jackson Dunbar
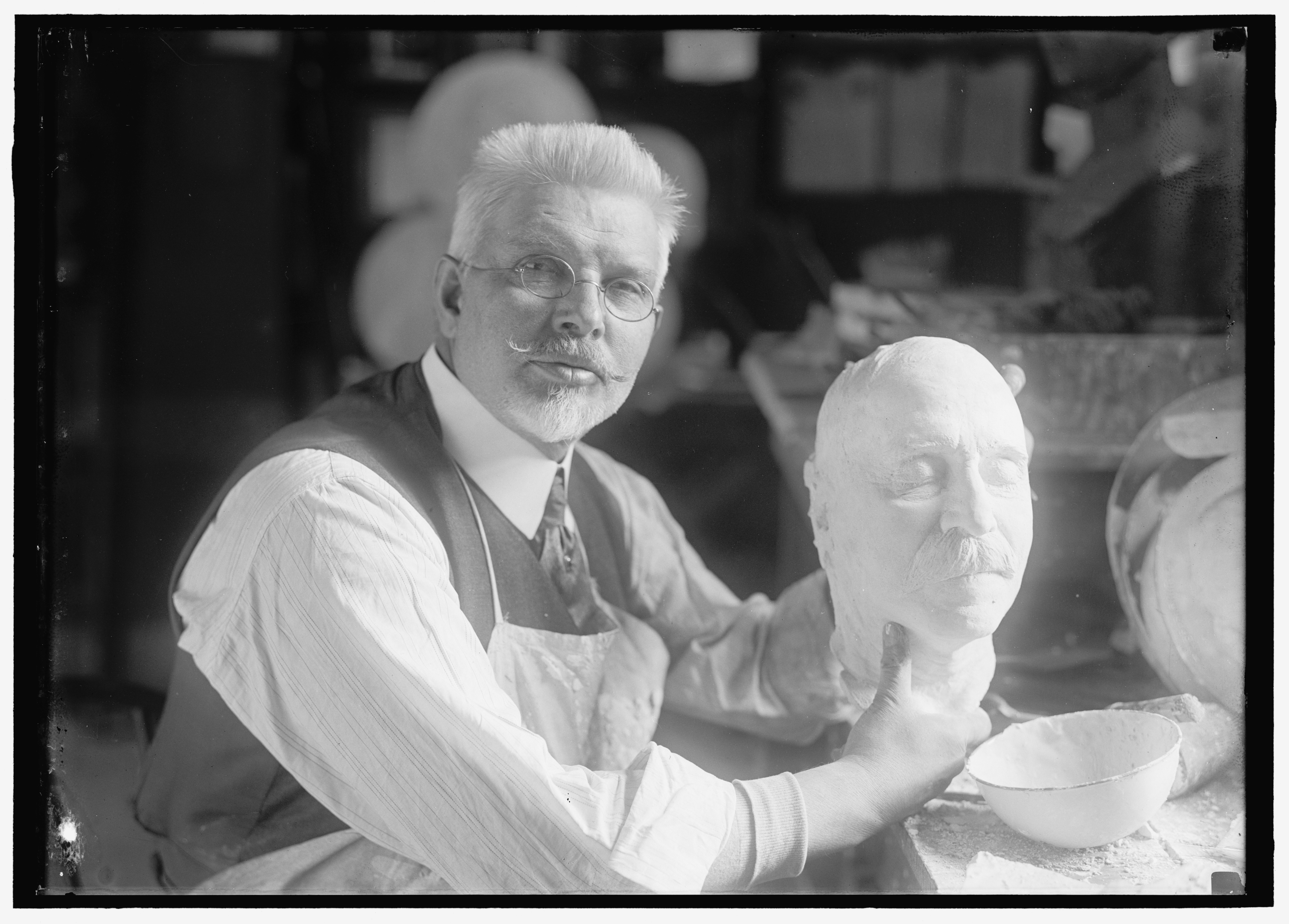
- Ulric Dunbar with a death-mask of George Dewey, 1917
- Born: January 31, 1862; London, Canada West
- Died: 1927 (aged 64–65); Washington, D.C., U.S.
- Education: Art School of Toronto
- Occupation: Sculptor
- Parent(s): Alexander Dunbar; Susannah Jackson

Ulric Stonewall Jackson Dunbar (January 31, 1862 – 1927) was a Canadian-born American sculptor.

== Early life ==
Ulric Stonewall Jackson Dunbar was born on January 31, 1862, in London, Canada West, the son of Alexander Dunbar and Susannah Jackson. He attended the Art School of Toronto with his brother Frederick and in around 1880, Ulric Dunbar emigrated from Canada to the United States to pursue a career in sculpting.

== Career ==
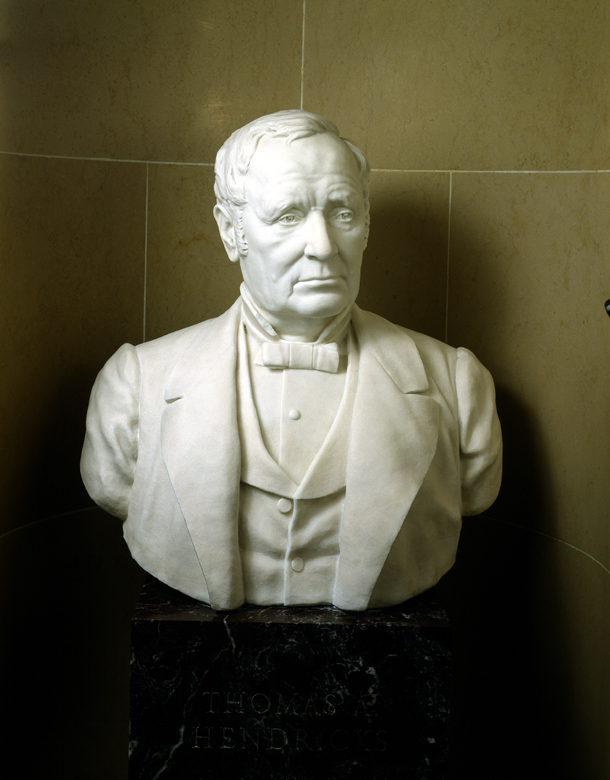
Thomas A. Hendricks by Ulric Dunbar.

After working for five years in Philadelphia, Dunbar moved to Washington, D.C. In 1886, he was commissioned to sculpt a model of Vice President Thomas Hendricks that took some four years to complete and was praised for its "straightforward, sober likeness with a degree of honest naturalism". Dunbar subsequently completed a "first-rate" marble bust of President Martin Van Buren. In his lifetime, Dunbar also sculpted models of Sitting Bull, William Wilson Corcoran, and Frederick Douglass, among many others; more than 150 sculptures are attributed to him. He was awarded a bronze medal at the 1893 World's Columbian Exhibition in Chicago and a silver medal at the 1915 Panama Pacific International Exposition in San Francisco. Dunbar served as the secretary of the Society of Washington Artists and counted Rudulph Evans and Louise Kidder Sparrow among his students. Ulric Dunbar died in Washington, D.C., in 1927.

A copy of Dunbar's bust of Thomas Hendricks, formerly in the collection of the Corcoran Gallery of Art, was upon that institution's dissolution transferred to the American University Museum. He sculpted a bust of the German-American landscape painter Max Weyl, who also lived in Washington, D.C. and whose works hung in the White House and is in the permanent collection at The Corcoran Art Gallery.
