= United States Senate chamber =

Room of the United States Capitol

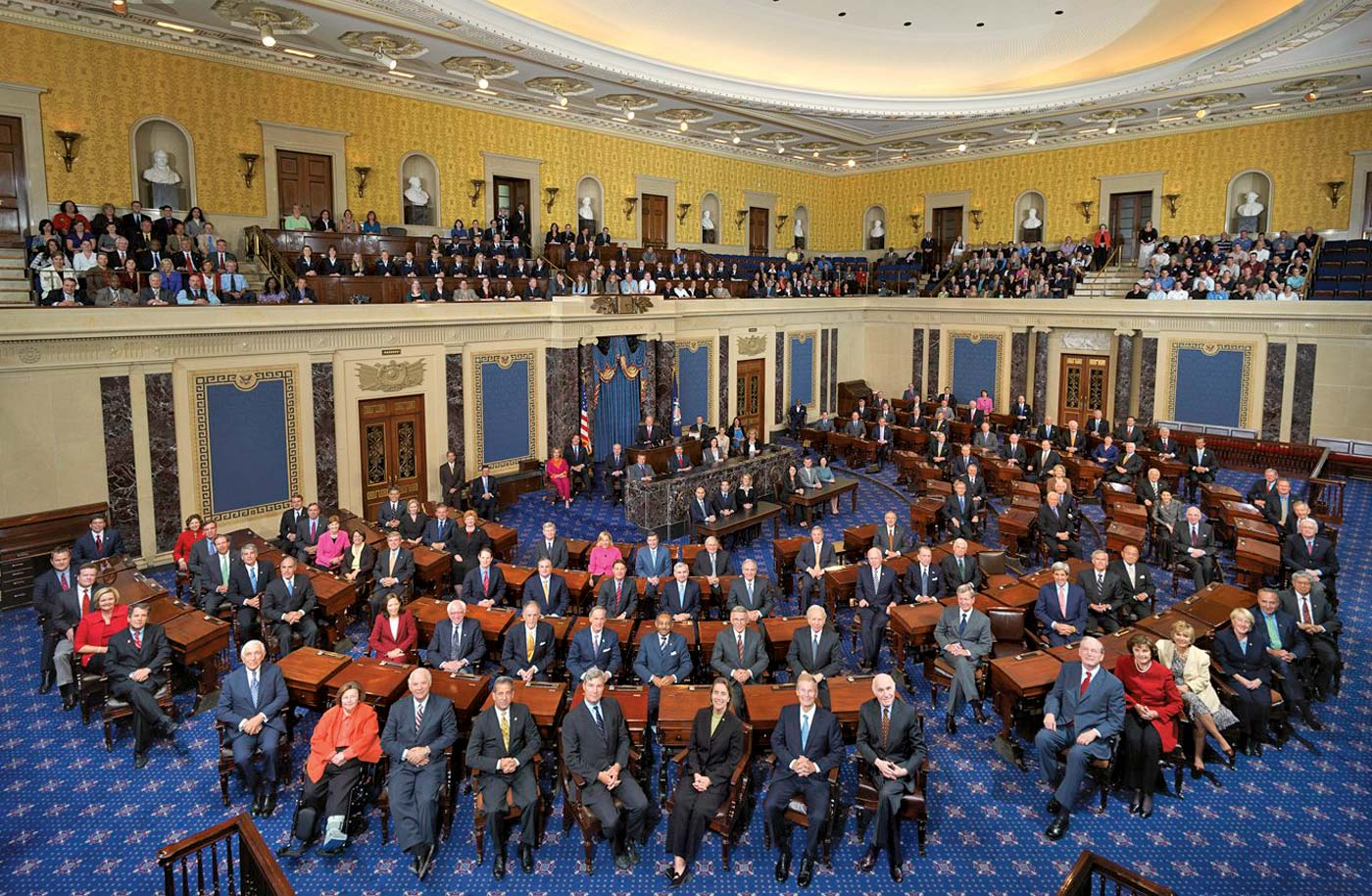
Class photo of the 111th United States Senate inside the chamber, 2010

The United States Senate chamber is a room in the north wing of the United States Capitol that has served as the legislative chamber of the United States Senate, since January 4, 1859. The Senate first convened in its current meeting place after utilizing Federal Hall, Congress Hall, and the Old Senate Chamber in the Capitol building for the same purpose.

The chamber, designed by then-Architect of the Capitol Thomas Ustick Walter, is a rectangular two-story room with 100 individual desks, one per Senator, on a multi-tiered semicircular platform facing a central rostrum in the front of the room. The Senate floor itself is overlooked on all four sides by a gallery on the second floor. The Senate floor itself is 80 by 113 feet (24 by 34 m).

== Origin and history ==
The Senate convened, beginning in 1790, in a second-floor chamber in Congress Hall in Philadelphia, Pennsylvania, until moving into the Old Supreme Court Chamber in the Capitol building in 1800. From 1810 to 1859, the Senate utilized the Old Senate Chamber for legislative functions.

During this time, the Senate nearly doubled in size as new states were admitted to the Union. In light of the increased size of both houses of congress, two new wings were added on to the United States Capitol. Beginning in 1851, the Capitol underwent several expansions including the new wings and their respective chambers, as well as a new dome.

=== Design and construction ===
In addition to expanding the space available for the Senate's use, the chamber's designers were concerned that the room have acoustical and line-of-sight qualities comparable to those of a theater. The construction of the chamber began in 1851 and continued until senators began utilizing the room for legislative business in 1859. Shortly after the senators began to use the chamber, they complained of its acoustic properties, the sounds created by rain as it hit the glass-paneled ceiling, and uncomfortable drafts of air throughout the room.

The general design of the chamber, a rectangular, two-story room in the center of the Capitol's north wing, includes 100 individual desks on a tiered platform. This platform, semi-circular in shape, faces a raised rostrum in the front of the room. On all four sides of the chamber's second level, a visitor's gallery overlooks the Senate floor. The Senate first allowed visitors to observe proceedings in 1795. The galleries for observing the Senate, including a women's gallery, became popular destinations for tourists and residents alike throughout the nineteenth century. Above the presiding officer's desk at the rostrum was the press gallery. Here, reporters can observe and cover the proceedings on the Senate.

=== Early usage ===
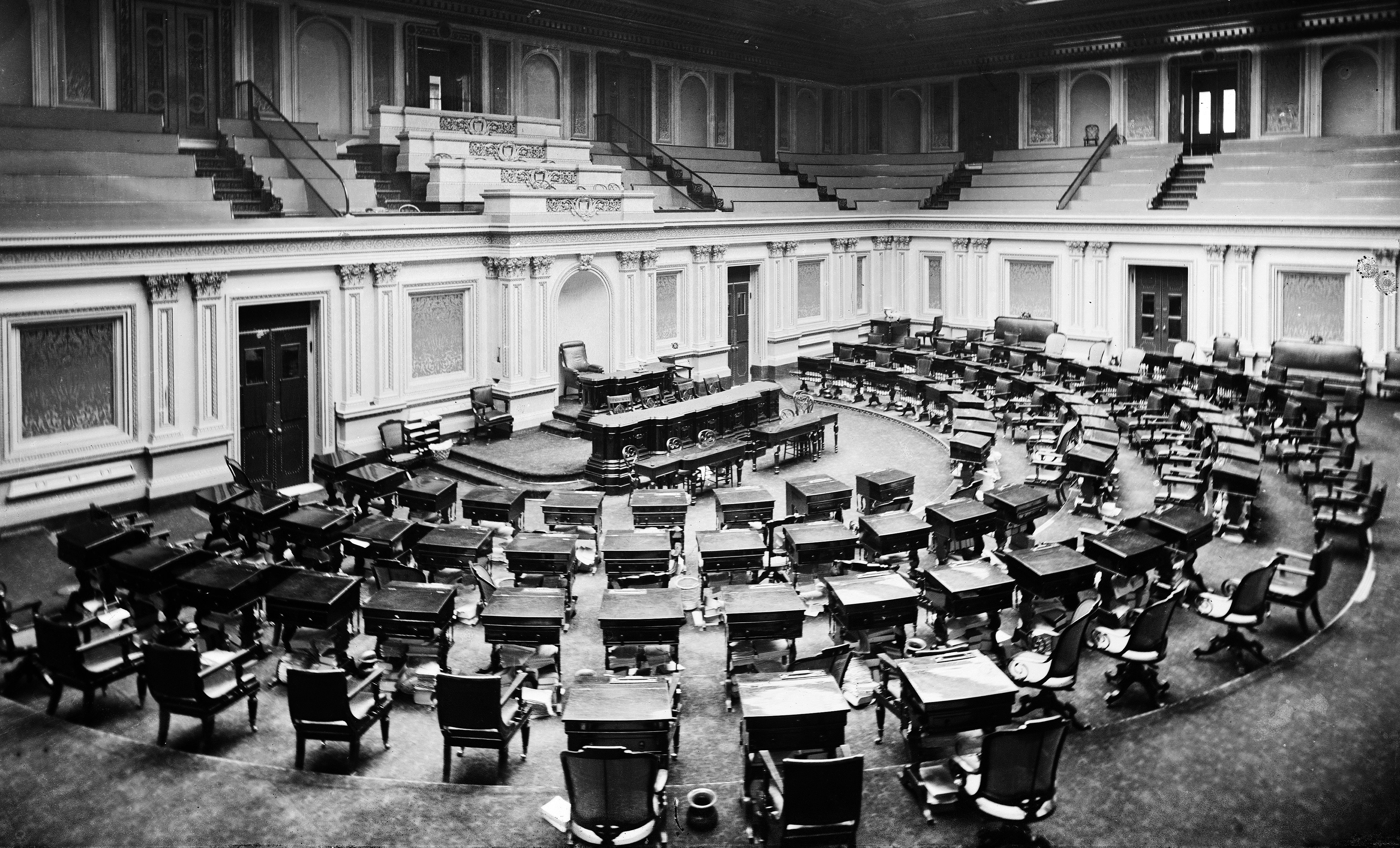
U.S. Senate chamber, circa 1873.

Because of the chamber's theater-like qualities and size, numerous requests were made and fulfilled to use the chamber for functions other than that of legislation. In 1863, the chamber was used for a presentation of a narrative poem ("The Sleeping Sentinel") about a Union Army soldier, William Scott, who had fallen asleep at his post and was sentenced to be shot. Among the audience for the performance was the then-President of the United States, Abraham Lincoln, who had actually pardoned the sentinel months earlier.

Senators grew tired of the competition for the chamber's usage, however, and allowed the final non-legislative usage of the chamber, a lecture on post-Civil War reconstruction, before enacting a rule dictating that the chamber would not be used for any purpose other than that of the United States Senate.

In 1923, practicing physician and former commissioner of the New York City Board of Health Royal Copeland began his first term in the Senate. He quickly noted the poor quality of the air in the chamber, arguing that the premature deaths of thirty-four serving senators over the previous twelve years were caused by the overly hot and poorly humidified air, which he blamed for the spread of common illnesses during the winter and the general discomfort of the chamber during the summer.

In June 1924, the Senate voted to adopt a measure by Copeland to improve the "living conditions of the Senate Chamber." Carrere & Hastings, the architectural firm that had designed the Russell Senate Office Building, submitted a plan for improvements, to include removing interior walls and lowering the ceiling, that was subsequently approved by the Senate on May 11, 1928. On May 16, however, Copeland requested the indefinite postponement of his proposal in light of a new ventilation system that received the endorsement of experts in public health. The "manufactured weather" ventilation system, the Senate's first air conditioning system, was designed by Carrier Corporation and completed in 1929.

== Modern design and use ==
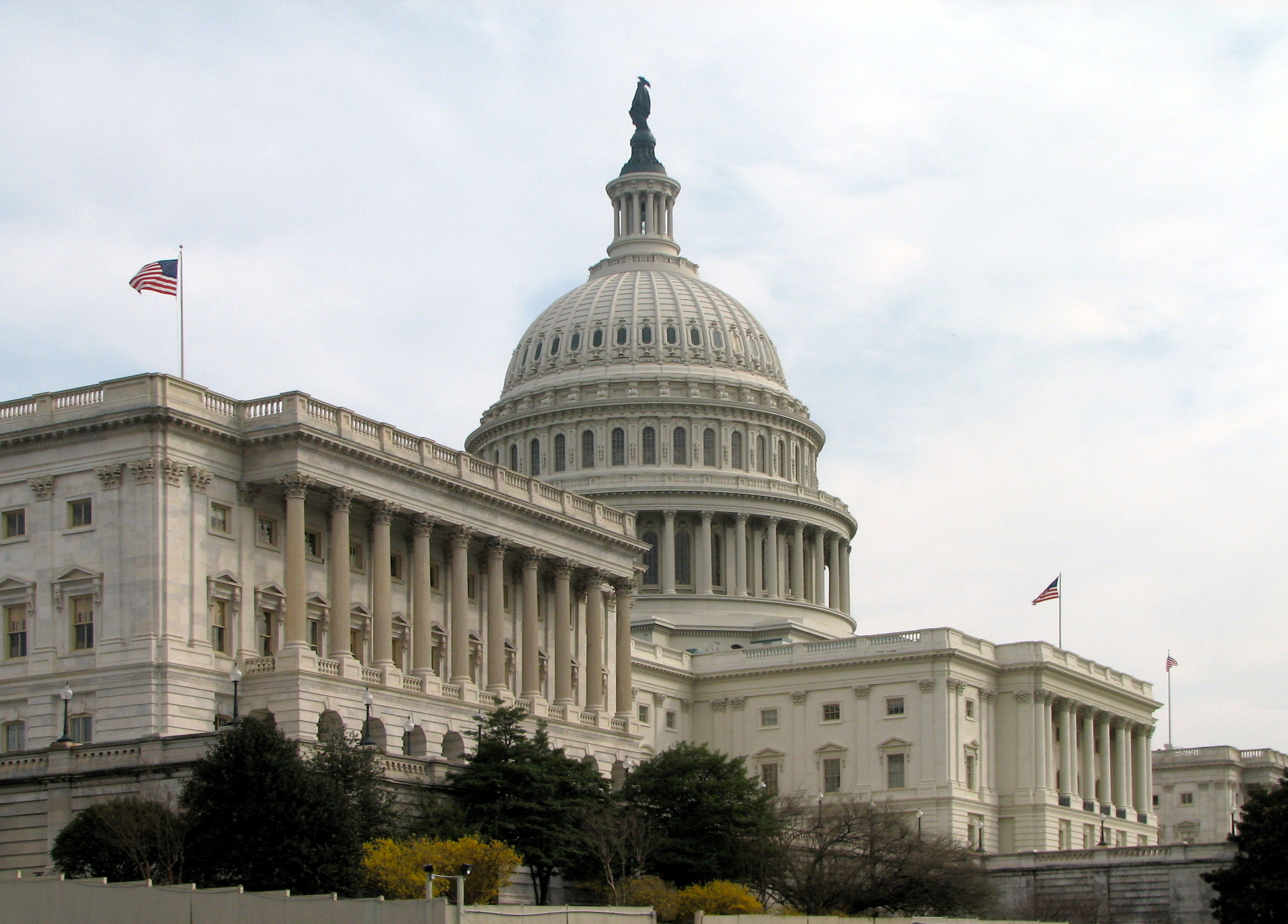
North wing of the Capitol, containing the Senate Chamber.

=== 1949–50 reconstruction ===
In 1949–50, the Senate Chamber underwent a reconstruction that involved the removal of the skylight and a redesign of the room's walls. In place of the chamber's original cast-iron pilasters, newer red Levanto marble pilasters were installed. The wooden rostrum was replaced with a newer, larger version made of marble. The iron and glass ceiling, including the skylight, was replaced with a ceiling of stainless steel and plaster. This redesign, in addition to improving the acoustic properties of the room, was to update the room's mid-nineteenth century decor, which was then out of date.

=== Photography in the chamber ===
Rule IV of the Senate prohibits the taking of photographs inside the Senate Chamber. The Senate suspended this rule on September 24, 1963, to take the first official photograph of the Senate. During the same year, the National Geographic Society requested permission to take the first official photograph of the Senate while in session for their illustrated volume We, the People. Once each two-year session of the United States Congress, the Photographic Studio of the Senate is charged with taking the official photo of the Senate.

=== Television coverage of the Senate ===
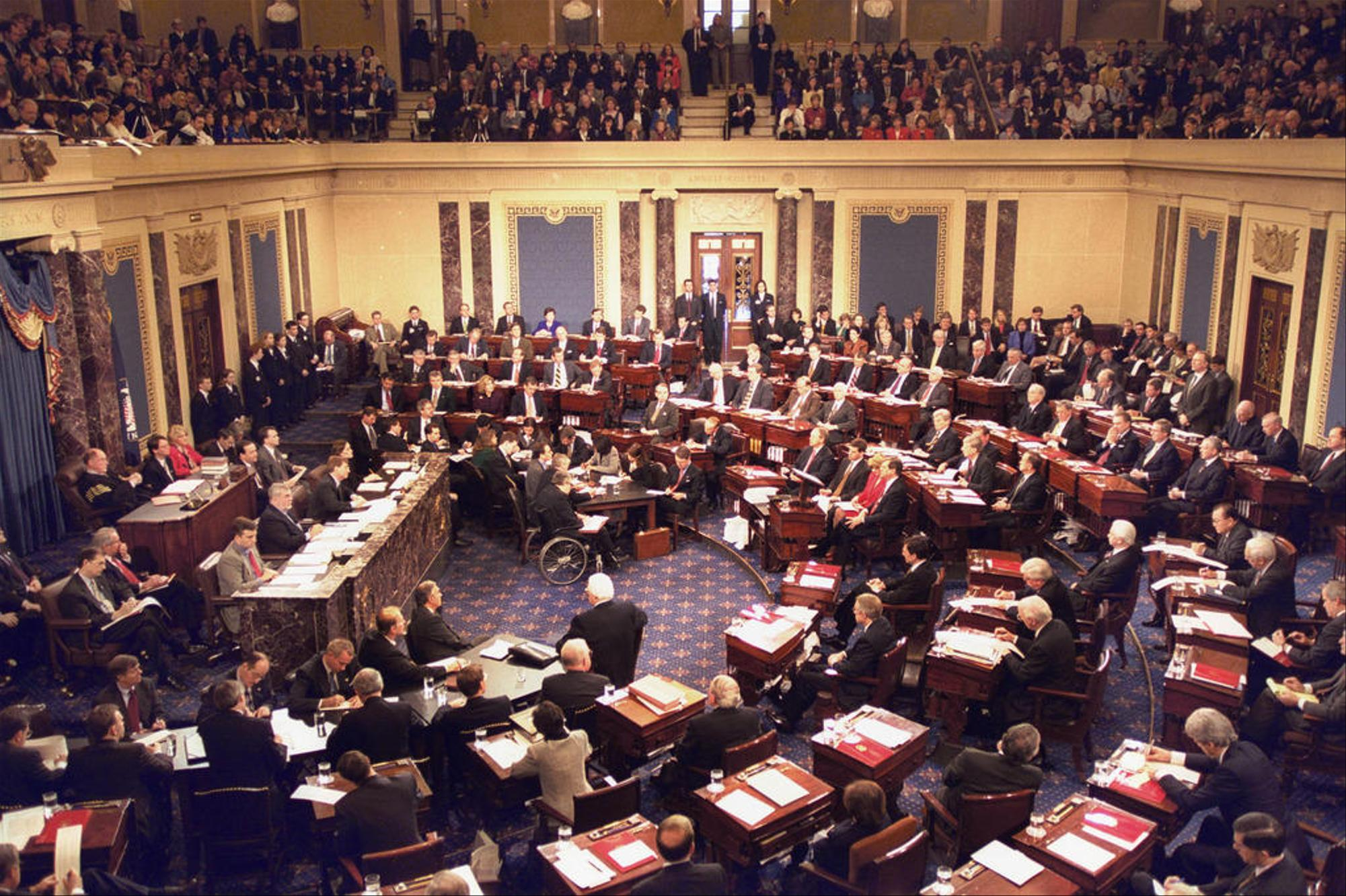
The trial of President Bill Clinton

Beginning in 1979, the House of Representatives began televising coverage of its daily sessions live on the network C-SPAN (Cable-Satellite Public Affairs Network). Senators originally opposed televised coverage of the daily sessions of the Senate, many expressing concern that televising proceedings would change significantly the conduct of the legislative process. In 1986, however, Senate floor leaders Bob Dole and Robert Byrd officially proposed live television coverage of the Senate. On June 2 of the same year, daily proceedings began broadcasting on the C-SPAN 2 network.

== See also ==
- United States Senate
- United States Capitol
- Old Senate Chamber
