= Graceland Cemetery (Washington, D.C.) =

Former cemetery in Washington, D.C., U.S.

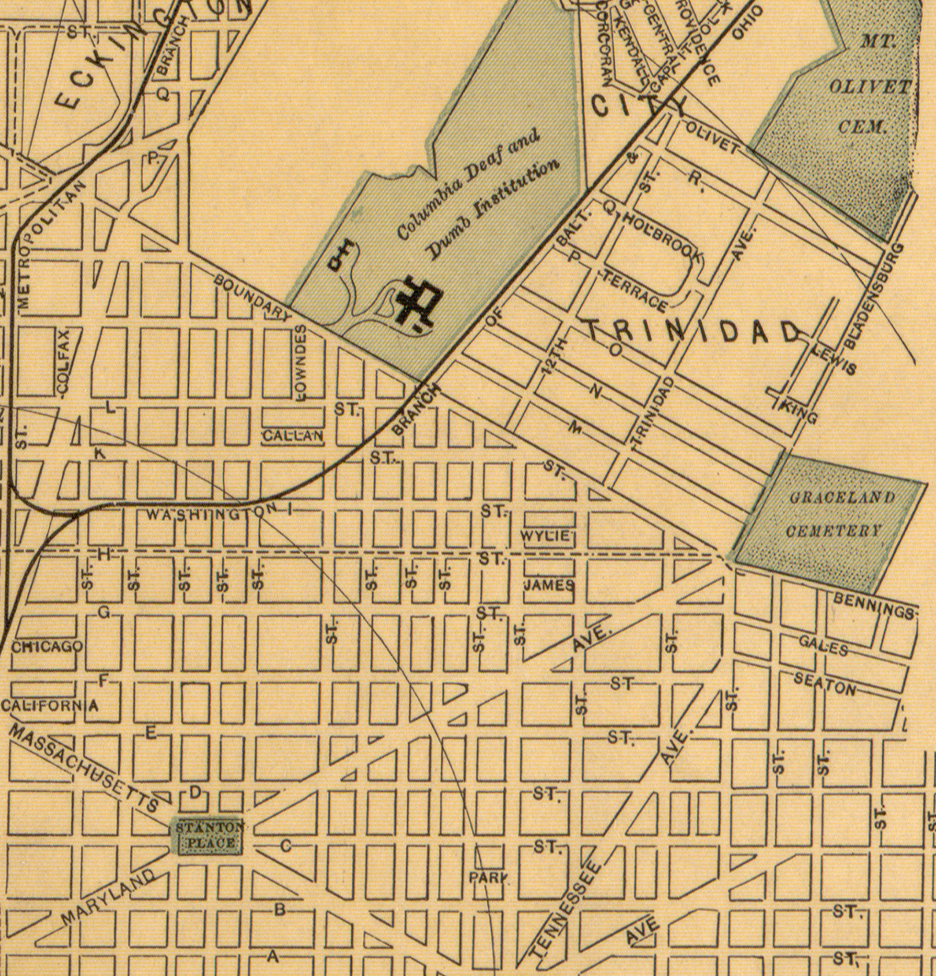
- 1893 map (detail) showing Graceland Cemetery
- Interactive map of Graceland Cemetery

Details
- Established: May 5, 1870
- Location: Carver Langston, Washington, D.C.
- Country: United States
- Coordinates: 38.900585°N 76.981879°W
- Type: secular and public; closed August 3, 1894
- Owned by: Graceland Cemetery Association of the District of Columbia
- Size: 30 acres (120,000 m^{2})
- No. of graves: 5,795
- The Political Graveyard: Graceland Cemetery

Graceland Cemetery was a 30-acre (120,000 m^{2}) cemetery located in the Carver Langston neighborhood of Washington, D.C., in the United States. It was founded in 1871 as a privately owned secular cemetery open to the public, but it primarily served the city's African American community. From 1884 to 1885, more than 1,200 bodies were transferred to Graceland Cemetery from Holmead's Burying Ground. When the cemetery encountered financial problems, the owners attempted to sell the land. This led to a lengthy and bitter battle involving the Graceland Cemetery Association, lot holders, the government of the District of Columbia, and the United States Congress. Graceland Cemetery was closed by an Act of Congress on August 3, 1894. Removal of remains was also bitterly contested, but a court ruled in the summer of 1895 that the lot holders did not have the right to prevent their removal. Most of the bodies at Graceland were reinterred at Woodlawn Cemetery in Washington, D.C.

A portion of Maryland Avenue NE runs through a portion of the former cemetery. Most of the cemetery was purchased by Washington Railway and Electric Company and turned into a powerhouse and streetcar operations complex. This land later became Hechinger Mall.

== Creation ==
Graceland Cemetery was created due to the need for a large, rural cemetery for African Americans in Washington, D.C., in the late 1800s. At the time, nearly all non-Catholic cemeteries in the city were racially segregated, with whites-only burial grounds refusing to inter black citizens on their property. By 1850, there were 16 cemeteries in the city of Washington, but only three served African Americans: (Eastern Methodist Cemetery, or "Old Ebenezer Cemetery"; the Harmoneon Cemetery, and Mount Pleasant Plains Cemetery). (Note: Eastern Methodist Cemetery was founded in 1824 by the Methodist Society at Ebenezer Station, commonly called the Fourth Street Methodist Church. The cemetery was also known as Ebenezer Cemetery or Old Ebenezer Cemetery.) On June 5, 1852, the D.C. City Council enacted legislation to prohibit interments at any burying ground inside the limits of the Federal City and to ban the establishment of new burial grounds within the Federal City. (Note: When initially established, the District of Columbia encompassed a square 10 miles (16 km) on each side. The "Federal City", or "City of Washington", was not at that time expected to fill the entire district, however. To encourage development and the appearance of a thriving urban center, the boundaries of the Federal City were the Potomac River, Rock Creek, Boundary Avenue NW and NE (now Florida Avenue), 15th Street NE, East Capitol Street, and the Anacostia River. Beyond the Federal City was the County of Washington. Georgetown was a distinct entity from both. All three entities merged into a single unified governmental entity in 1890.)

The city's rapidly increasing African American population desperately needed a new cemetery. In 1870, a group of progressive white citizens decided to buy a plot of land just beyond the border of the Federal City and build a racially integrated cemetery. (Note: The incorporators included Thomas Logan Tullock and Seymour W. Tullock, the latter of whom was elected vice president of the cemetery association.) Graceland Cemetery was chartered by an Act of Congress in Section 5 of the Act of May 5, 1870 ("An act to provide for the creation of corporations in the District of Columbia under general law", 16 Stat. 106). It was incorporated under the laws of the District of Columbia on September 30, 1871. Two weeks later, on October 16, 1871, the Graceland Cemetery Association acquired 30 acres (120,000 m^{2}) for a burying ground on a tract of land bounded by Bladensburg Road NE, K Street NE, 17th Street NE, and Benning Road NE.

== Operation ==
From 1871 to 1873, Graceland Cemetery was landscaped and numerous trees were planted. Winding walkways were laid out through the cemetery's gently rolling hills, and an expensive caretaker's house was constructed. The southern half of the property sloped to the south. There were several springs here, and this area was somewhat marshy. The eastern terminus of the Columbia Railway, one of the city's largest streetcar companies, was across the street. The cemetery was on top of a hill, which gave it excellent views of the city and United States Capitol.

Graceland Cemetery was governed by a Board of Directors. The board consisted of a president, secretary-treasurer, and three directors. (Note: The board was first mentioned in city newspapers in September 1879. At that time, the board members consisted of Dr. Otis F. Presbrey, president; F.C. Cate, secretary-treasurer; and Samuel Norment, Thomas L. Tullock (or Tulloch), and Benjamin Freeman, directors.) A seven-member Advisory Board was also established to advise the Board of Directors on cemetery operations. (Note: The Advisory Board was first mentioned in city newspapers in September 1879. At that time, the Advisory Board members consisted of W.O. Denison, chair, and Dr. William Tindall, Dr. S.S. Stearns, C. Parkinson, W.H. Gafford, John G. Auld, and Dr. F.A. Ashford, members.)

The cemetery opened about April 1873. In its first nine months of operation, about 40 burials occurred. Nearly all of these were along the cemetery's southern boundary, which ran along Benning Road.

About 42,000 burial lots existed at Graceland. Lot prices were initially held low, to encourage burials. Lot prices ranged from $3 in the marshy southern area to $22 for a prime hilltop site. Burial costs were also low: Opening and closing a grave cost just $4, while handling the body cost $5. (Grave markers, burial vaults, fences, and other improvements cost significantly more.) In comparison, at the highly popular (and almost all-white) Rock Creek Cemetery, opening and closing a grave cost $6.50.

Although at times popular with the city's black community, Graceland never quite caught on. The Columbian Harmony Cemetery was the city's most popular African American cemetery, with Payne's Cemetery in the Marshall Heights neighborhood east of the Anacostia River the second most popular. Graceland Cemetery was not very popular, however, until 1890. A total of 4,722 African Americans were buried there between 1880 and 1894 (just 4.7 percent of all black burials in the city), but it was the top burying ground for African Americans in 1890 and 1891. At the time it closed, several hundred (perhaps thousands) of as-yet unused burial plots at Graceland were owned by blacks. Although only 1,073 whites were buried at Graceland from 1880 to 1894 (just 0.8 percent of all white burials in the city, this was actually quite a substantial number for a racially integrated cemetery. Nonetheless, by February 1893 there were 5,700 interments at Graceland. Most of these were in a 100-foot (30 m) wide strip along the southern border. Lots here were the cheapest in the cemetery, largely due to its marshy nature.

=== Complaints about operations ===
Although Graceland Cemetery was intended to be a rural cemetery, well away from development, housing, and other buildings were soon built around it. As early as June 1873, a three-story, 25-room hotel was constructed across the street from Graceland. By January 1878, a large number of new homes had been constructed near the burying ground. The stench of decomposing bodies and the smell and foul taste of burials left in the local water supply greatly alarmed local residents, who suffered an outbreak of typhoid in 1877. The D.C. Board of Public Health was worried, too, and it commissioned a study of the cemetery in late 1877 to study the issue. Although the Board found in January 1878 that the cemetery was not responsible for the typhoid outbreak, it expressed its concern that a major burying ground was so near to homes.

The complaints did not end, however. In April 1892, a large number of local residents as well as physicians complained about the foul-tasting and smelling water in the vicinity of Graceland Cemetery. More than 200 local residents signed a petition asking the Board of Public Health to close it. Another typhoid outbreak in the summer of 1892 intensified the pressure to close Graceland. Investigation by city health officials found that the soil in the southern part of the cemetery was so marshy that graves often filled with water when dug (and had to be bailed out before a coffin could be lowered). Officials asserted that the graves were also dug too close to one another so that the walls between graves often collapsed—allowing germs and disease from a nearby decomposing body to wash into the new, open grave. Eventually, pressure to close the cemetery became so strong that legislation was introduced in the waning days of the 52nd United States Congress to close the cemetery. The D.C. City Commissioners supported the bill, H.B. 9874, which was introduced by Senator Jacob Harold Gallinger (R-New Hampshire) and Representative John J. Hemphill (D-South Carolina). Even The Washington Post editorialized in favor of the bill. The legislation was strongly opposed by Frank Presbrey, the president of Graceland Cemetery, and the Graceland board of directors. The bill died when Congress adjourned on March 3, 1893.

With congressional action having, for the time being, failed, city residents pressured the city to act under power granted to the District of Columbia under Joint Resolution 4 of 1892. Section 2 of the Joint Resolution gave the city commissioners broad power to make "police regulations". (Note: Section 2 of the Joint Resolution read: "That the Commissioners of the District of Columbia are hereby authorized and empowered to make and enforce all such reasonable and usual police regulations in addition to those already made under the act of January twenty-sixth, eighteen hundred and eighty-seven, as they may deem necessary for the protection of lives, limbs, health, comfort and quiet of all persons and the protection of all property within the District of Columbia.") But questions were raised as to whether the Joint Resolution actually conferred the power to close Graceland Cemetery (e.g., was closure a police power?) In late March 1893, the D.C. Assistant Attorney said he doubted that closure fell under the general police regulatory power.

== Closure ==
New legislation to bar further interments at Graceland Cemetery was introduced into the 53rd United States Congress. The House bill was H.R.6915, and the Senate bill (once more sponsored by Senator Gallinger) was S.2245. Once again, the legislation was strongly supported by the city commissioners. The House Committee on the District of Columbia favorably reported the bill on July 5, and the Senate Committee on the District of Columbia followed suit on July 6. The full Senate passed the bill on July 23, and the House on August 3, 1894.

Section 1 of the Act revoked the charter of the Graceland Cemetery Association. However, the board of directors was permitted to continue in order that it might carry out the provisions of the law. (It was also permitted to fill vacancies on the board by unanimous vote.) Section 1 also barred any further interments at the burial ground as of the date of enactment. A fine of $100 to $500 was imposed for violations of the law.

Section 2 of the Act required the Graceland Cemetery Association to remove all the bodies from the burial ground and reinter them at some other suitable cemetery or cemeteries in the District of Columbia. The board was authorized to subdivide and sell the land for any purpose. Proceeds from the sale were to be used to pay the debts of the cemetery association. Afterward, five percent of the proceeds went to the board of directors as compensation for their services. The remaining funds were then to be distributed among the lot holders on a pro-rate basis. Once disbursement was made, the board was ordered to dissolve.

== Final disposition of Graceland Cemetery ==
An unknown but small number of burials occurred at Graceland Cemetery after its August 3 closure. These occurred after the city government and Graceland Cemetery Association board of directors failed to adequately communicate with the sextons at the cemetery. But no burials were recorded after August 23, 1894.

Removing nearly 6,000 bodies from a cemetery was a task never before undertaken in Washington, D.C. Protecting public health, especially in the wake of complaints going back 15 years, was paramount. On September 5, 1894, the city commissioners adopted health regulations governing the disinterment of bodies at Graceland. The regulations prohibited disinterments in June, July, August, and September (the hottest months of the year, and the months in which corpses would be decomposing most rapidly), and required reinterments within 24 hours. If the deceased had died of diphtheria, the open grave was required to be saturated with chloride of lime and left open for a minimum of 24 hours before the corpse could be removed. The commissioners also moved to ease the grief that some might feel as their loved ones were disinterred; the regulations prohibited the disinterment of anyone under the age of 12 unless one year had passed since their death. The regulations barring disinterment in the hot months were temporarily rescinded in June 1895, after a lengthy heat wave dried out the marshy ground (making corpses less likely to be in advanced decomposition). (Despite concerns, the dry weather indeed prevented decomposition and there were no odors emanating from the cemetery despite the large number of disinterments).

Meanwhile, several of Graceland Cemetery's directors formed the Woodlawn Cemetery Association, which was incorporated on January 8, 1895. They subsequently purchased a 22.5-acre (91,000 m^{2}) plot of land adjacent to Payne's Cemetery across the Anacostia River. Burial plots were quickly laid out on this property, and Woodlawn Cemetery opened on May 13, 1895.

=== Lawsuit ===
The disinterment process was not without controversy. On July 1, 1895, a group of lot holders (most of them black) met to protest the removal of bodies from Graceland Cemetery. The meeting was chaired by H.D. Davis, and W.P. Hall was elected secretary. The lotholders had a number of grievances. Many wanted to see Graceland subdivided into building lots rather than sold as a large parcel, for subdivided land would sell at a higher cost. Others did not want to see their loved ones buried at Woodlawn Cemetery (which was denigrated as "unenclosed forest and a truck garden"), and preferred to receive money from the sale of Graceland now and make the choice of burial location themselves. J. Harry Smith, a local attorney, addressed the lotholders and urged them to sue to protect their rights. The lotholders voted to form the "Protective Association of the Lot and Site Owners of Graceland Cemetery", and elected Dr. John R. Frances president of the new organization. At a second meeting, held July 9, more than 400 lotholders appeared to support the nascent group.

At a second meeting on July 23, the Protective Association voiced its concerns in greater depth. Lotholders had not been given a choice in the selection of a site for the new cemetery, they said. The Graceland board of trustees had merely chosen the cheapest site they could find, cleared only five of the site's 30 acres (120,000 m^{2}), laid out two incomplete roads through the site, and refused to build a receiving vault. Lotholders also complained that Graceland Cemetery had not notified them when bodies were to be disinterred, and refused to tell them where the bodies were being buried at Woodlawn. One lotholder who visited Woodlawn Cemetery claimed that bodies were being interred at a rate of 12 a day there, with graves just 8 to 9 inches (20 to 23 cm) apart (side by side and head to foot). Dr. Francis resigned as president of the Protective Association, and Mr. H.A. Davis was elected president. The lotholders adopted a constitution for their association, voted to sue the cemetery, and began raising funds for their lawsuit. The goal of the group was to construct a new cemetery, one ideally located and in a desirable area.

The lotholders' lawsuit was initially successful. On August 26, 1895, Judge Louis E. McComas of the D.C. Superior Court issued a temporary injunction against the Graceland Cemetery Association, barring further disinterments. The court gave the association until September 9 to reply to the injunction. The Protective Association alleged in its pleading that some members of the Board of Directors of Graceland had, without the consent or authority of either the lotholders or board of directors, had joined with others to form the Woodlawn Cemetery Association and purchase 30 acres (120,000 m^{2}) of land for a new cemetery. The Protective Association also claimed that the Graceland Cemetery Association was removing bodies from Graceland Cemetery without the consent of the lotholders, and without providing them with information on where their loved ones were being reburied. Finally, the Protective Association challenged the Act of August 3, 1894, as an unconstitutional violation of the Due Process Clause of the Fourteenth Amendment to the United States Constitution.

Because of District regulations prohibiting the removal of bodies during summer months and the impact of injunction, only 400 bodies had been disinterred from Graceland Cemetery by September 23.

The Graceland Cemetery Association replied to the injunction in late September. The cemetery's attorneys asserted before the court that the lotholders did not, in fact, have fee simple title to burial lots, and denied that lotholders were not told when loved ones were disinterred. They acknowledged that some lotholders wanted their family members removed to a burial ground other than Woodlawn Cemetery. They said they were willing to reimburse they lotholders for reasonable disinterment and reinterment costs.

The Graceland Cemetery Association won the day, and on October 12, 1895, Edward Franklin Bingham, Chief Justice of the D.C. Supreme Court, dissolved the temporary injunction.

=== Completion of disinterments ===
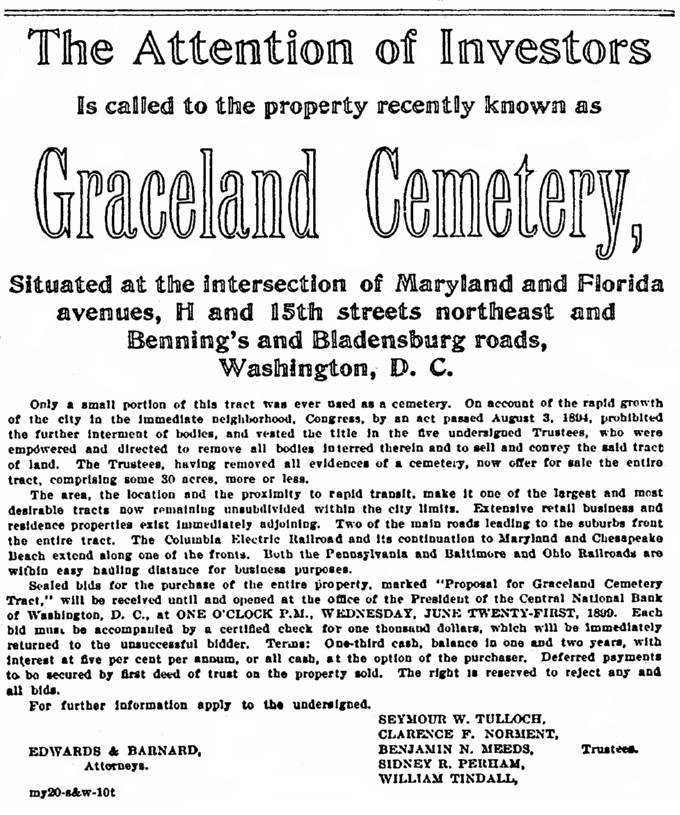
1899 advertisement announcing the sale of Graceland Cemetery property.

As disinterments accelerated through late 1895 and early 1896, Graceland Cemetery began to incur substantial expenses. By the end of 1896, the cemetery had disinterred 637 bodies at a cost of $5,002.57.

By January 1897, the cemetery was close to running out of money to continue the process. The cemetery sought to mortgage its property to raise the necessary funds, but lacked the legal authority to do so. It sought the assistance of Congress, and in January 1897 Senator James McMillan and Representative Joseph W. Babcock (R-Wisconsin) sponsored legislation to permit the cemetery to mortgage its land. The House and Senate quickly passed the legislation, and President Grover Cleveland signed it into law on March 3, 1897 (his last day in office).

With funds secured, Graceland Cemetery rapidly disinterred the remaining bodies. By early November 1897, nearly all the graves had been emptied. Cemetery officials estimated that disinterals would be finished by January 1, 1898.

=== Disbursement of funds ===
The Graceland Cemetery Association put the cemetery up for sale on June 14, 1899. But there were no immediate offers for the land. Some individuals who made down payments on burial plots at Graceland Cemetery were still demanding their money back. But Benjamin Meeds, the cemetery association's secretary, pointed out that the congressional legislation only allowed payments to be made to lot holders—not those who had made down payments but had never finished purchasing their lots. Meeds said he regretted that these individuals, many of them poor, would lose their down payments. But the law did not permit otherwise.

Identifying lotholders proved to be a difficult and time-consuming process. It was not until January 9, 1913, that the board of directors first advertised their willingness to distribute the proceeds from the sale of land to the lot holders. But there was still concern that not all lot holders had been identified. Board members Seymour W. Tullock, Benjamin N. Meeds, Clarence J. Norment, William Tindall, and Odell S. Smith asked Justice Job Barnard of the D.C. Supreme Court for help. The trustees, they said, had made an effort to distribute the proceeds, but were unable to determine who the $115,248.65 should go to. Justice Barnard appointed an auditor to receive claims and make the disbursements.

With the cemetery's affairs in the hands of the auditor, the board of directors dissolved.

=== Post-cemetery use ===
As expected, the City of Washington pushed several street extensions through the former Graceland Cemetery tract. The most important of these was Maryland Avenue NE. In May 1895, the D.C. city commissioners announced plans to extend Maryland Avenue NE through the former grounds of the burial ground. The city in 1901 asked the cemetery to donate 53 percent of its land for the construction of Maryland Avenue and other streets. But the cemetery refused, arguing that federal law permitted only land sales. The city then offered the cemetery $75,000 to buy the needed land, but the Graceland Cemetery board declined the offer—arguing the land was worth close to $200,000. It was not until 1936, however, that Maryland Avenue was extended through the property. The city paid $317,500 for land to extend not only Maryland Avenue but also 17th Street and H Street NE. The extension was complete by June 1937.

There was also a major effort made to seize the former Graceland Cemetery for use as a public park. In July 1895, the Northeast Citizens Association, an organization of local residents in the area near the cemetery, asked the city to purchase the burying ground and convert it into a public park. Six years later, the citizens' group was still pushing for a park. Movement on a park finally occurred in 1907. H.B. 7354 provided $150,000 to purchase the cemetery for use as a city park. But the city commissioners opposed the plan, arguing that there wasn't enough residential development in the area to justify the move. The bill died at the end of the 59th United States Congress on March 3, 1907. Senator Nathan B. Scott (R-West Virginia) introduced a new bill in the 60th United States Congress. The bill passed the Senate, but died at the end of the 60th Congress on March 3, 1909. The Northeast Citizens Association continued to press for a park in 1909, and Senator Scott introduced a new bill (S.B. 158) in February 1910 in the 61st United States Congress. The Senate approved the bill, which still provided $150,000 for land purchases, in February 1911. But once more, the legislation died when Congress adjourned on March 3, 1911.

The final disposition of Graceland Cemetery (and the source of the $115,248.65 disbursed to lot holders) came in 1901. In December, the Washington Railway and Electric Company purchased 40,090 square feet (3,724 m^{2}) of land for $26,000. This included a 100-foot (30 m) long section of land on 15th Street NE and a 400-foot (120 m) long section of land on H Street NE to accommodate a streetcar line extension. The square footage reported by The Evening Star newspaper was not the whole story, however. In fact, the railway had purchased the entire property. Only the reported acreage was to be used for streetcar tracks. The rest was to be used for the construction of an electric powerhouse, carhouse, maintenance shop, storehouse, and storage yard. The price paid by the railway totaled $116,155.80. By 1917, the value of the land had risen to $227,466.

The Washington Railway and Electric Company spun off its power operations into a new company, Pepco, which continued to hold title to the land. In 1978, Pepco sold the now-unused land to the Hechinger Company, which built Hechinger Mall on the site in 1979.

== Notable former interments ==
- John Mifflin Brown (1825–1893), bishop of the African Methodist Episcopal Church
- Richard H. Cain (1825–1887), bishop of the African Methodist Episcopal Church and Republican member of the United States House of Representatives from South Carolina's at-large congressional seat in 1873 (believed removed in 1895 to Woodlawn Cemetery)
- John Hartwell Cook (1839–1879), a graduate of the first class of the Howard University School of Law and later Dean of the school
- Anna Murray-Douglass (1813–1882), abolitionist and the wife of Frederick Douglass (removed in February 1895 to Mount Hope Cemetery in Rochester, New York)
- John Willis Menard (1838–1893), the first African American ever elected to Congress (Note: Menard was elected to the House of Representatives to fill the unexpired term of the incumbent in Louisiana's 2nd congressional district. Racist elements in his district challenged his being seated in the House, and he never served.) (believed moved in 1895 to Woodlawn Cemetery)
- Lewis Powell, a conspirator in the assassination of Abraham Lincoln, may have been buried at Graceland Cemetery but disinterred and moved to Holmead's Burying Ground or Rock Creek Cemetery when Graceland closed. But the evidence is incomplete, and burial at Graceland is not confirmed.
- Philip Reid (1820–1892), a former slave who cast the Statue of Freedom atop the United States Capitol (removed to Columbian Harmony Cemetery in 1895 and then to National Harmony Memorial Park in 1959)
- Maria W. Stewart (1803–1880), African American journalist, lecturer, abolitionist, and women's rights activist

== Bibliography ==
- Bailey, N. Louise; Morgan, Mary L.; Taylor, Carolyn R. (1986). Biographical Directory of the South Carolina Senate: 1776-1985. Volume 1. Columbia, S.C.: University of South Carolina Press. ISBN 0872494799.
- Bak, Richard (1998). The Day Lincoln Was Shot: An Illustrated Chronicle. Dallas: Taylor Publishing. ISBN 0878332006.
- Board of Commissioners (1937). Report of the Government of the District of Columbia for the Year Ended June 30, 1937. Washington, D.C.: Government Printing Office.
- Carter, Marva Griffin (2008). Swing Along: The Musical Life of Will Marion Cook. New York: Oxford University Press. ISBN 9780195108910.
- Committee on the District of Columbia (1894). Graceland Cemetery. House of Representatives, 52d Congress, 2d session, Report 1293. Washington, D.C.: Government Printing Office.
- Henry, William Wirt; Spofford, Ainsworth Rand (1893). Eminent and Representative Men of Virginia and the District of Columbia in the Nineteenth Century. Madison, Wisc.: Brant and Fuller. p. 333. "Graceland Cemetery."
- Ownsbey, Betty J. (1993). Alias "Paine:" Lewis Thornton Powell, the Mystery Man of Lincoln Conspiracy. Jefferson, N.C.: McFarland & Company. ISBN 089950874X.
- Pippenger, Wesley E. (2004). Dead People On the Move!. Westminster, Md.: Willow Bend Books. ISBN 0788431943.
- Richardson, Steven J. (1989). "The Burial Grounds of Black Washington: 1880-1919". Records of the Columbia Historical Society, Washington, D.C.: 304–326.
- Sluby, Paul E. Jr. (Spring–Summer 1989). "Woodlawn Cemetery, Washington, D.C.: Brief History and Inscriptions". Journal of the Afro-American Historical and Genealogical Society: 70–100.
- Smolenyak, Megan S. (May–June 2009). "Philip Reid, the Slave Who Rescued Freedom". Ancestry Magazine: 54–56.
- Streitmatter, Rodger (1994). Raising Her Voice: African-American Women Journalists Who Changed History. Lexington, Ky.: University Press of Kentucky. ISBN 9780813118611.
- United States Congress (1895). The Statutes at Large of the United States of America From August, 1893, to March, 1895, and Recent Treaties, Conventions, and Executive Proclamations. Volume 28. Washington, D.C.: Government Printing Office.
