= Eastern Cemetery (disambiguation) =

Eastern Cemetery is an historic cemetery in East Bayside neighborhood of Portland, Maine, USA.

Eastern Cemetery may also refer to:

- Geelong Eastern Cemetery, Victoria, Australia
- Eastern Cemetery (Louisville), Kentucky, United States
- Eastern Cemetery (Madrid), Spain
- Eastern Cemetery (Uddevalla), Sweden
- Eastern Cemetery, Kingston upon Hull, UK
- Eastern Methodist Cemetery, also known as Old Ebenezer Cemetery or Ebenezer Cemetery, in the Barney Circle neighborhood of Washington, D.C., USA
- Giza East Field, the cemetery to the east of the Great Pyramid of Giza
