= Graceland Cemetery (disambiguation) =

Graceland Cemetery is the name for a number of cemeteries, burying grounds, and graveyards around the world.

- Graceland Cemetery, a large Victorian era cemetery located near Chicago, Illinois, in the United States
- Graceland Cemetery (Abbeville), a cemetery near Abbeville, Louisiana, in the United States
- Graceland Cemetery (Albany), a cemetery near Albany, New York, in the United States
- Graceland Cemetery (Miami), a cemetery in Miami, Florida, in the United States
- Graceland Cemetery (Milwaukee), a cemetery near Milwaukee, Wisconsin, in the United States
- Graceland Cemetery (Racine), a cemetery near Racine, Wisconsin, in the United States
- Graceland Cemetery (South Carolina)
- Graceland Cemetery (South Dakota), a historic rural cemetery near Mitchell, South Dakota, in the United States
- Graceland Cemetery (Washington, D.C.), a racially integrated cemetery that existed in Washington, D.C. in the United States in the 1800s.
