= Leonard Bailey =

Leonard Bailey may refer to:

- Leonard Bailey (inventor) (1825–1905), inventor/toolmaker who invented a plane (tool)
- Leonard C. Bailey (1825–1918), African-American business owner and inventor
- Leonard Lee Bailey (1942–2019), surgeon who transplanted a baboon heart into Baby Fae
