= William Henry Harrison Hart =

American lawyer (1857–1934)

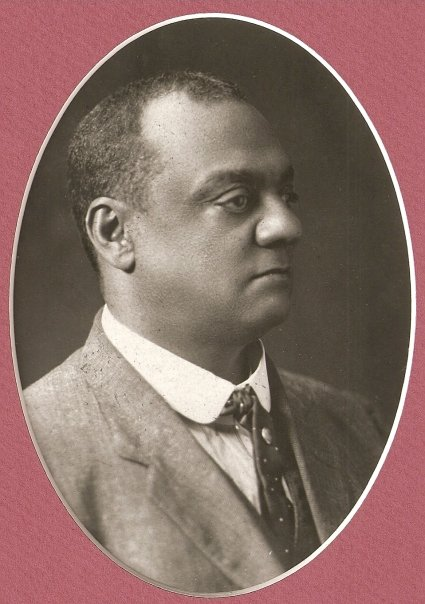
- Professor Hart
- Born: October 30, 1857; Eufaula, Alabama, U.S.
- Died: January 6, 1934 (aged 76); Brooklyn, New York, U.S.
- Resting place: National Harmony Memorial Park, Landover, Maryland
- Education: Howard University (BA, MA, LLB)
- Occupations: Professor, Lawyer, Activist, and Entrepreneur
- Spouse: Mary M. Olney
- Children: William H. H. Hart Jr., Clementine Hart
- Parent(s): Henry Clay Hart, Jennie Dunn

William Henry Harrison Hart (October 30, 1857 – January 6, 1934) was an African American attorney and professor of criminal law at Howard University from 1887 to 1922. He won an important legal case, Hart v. State, 100 MD 595 (1905).

== Biography ==
Hart was born in Eufaula, Alabama, on October 31, 1857. His father was Henry Clay Hart, a white slave trader born in Providence, Rhode Island, in 1829. He was a descendant of Thomas Hart, an English jurist who embarked at Baddow, Essex county, England, in the Desire, in 1635, landing at Ipswich, Massachusetts, in 1639. He attended the American Missionary Association School in Eufaula from 1867 to 1874. In 1874, when conservative whites attempted to oust the Reconstruction Era state government, Hart campaigned in favor of Reconstruction. His life was threatened, and he fled Eufaula. He walked all the way to Washington, D.C.

Upon arriving in Washington, D.C., Hart enrolled in the college preparatory program at Howard University in 1876 and graduated with a Preparatory Department Certificate in 1880. He enrolled in the undergraduate program, and received a Bachelor of Arts (BA) degree in 1885. He entered the Howard University School of Law, and received his Bachelor of Laws (LLB) in 1887. From Howard University he also received a Master of Arts (MA) degree in 1889, and a Master of Laws (LLM) degree in 1891. While a law student, he worked for Senator William M. Evarts as a private secretary. In 1890, Hart was selected as the Dean of the Howard's Criminal Law Department and the Dean of the Agriculture Department in 1897. In March 1895 he was admitted to practice law before the United States Supreme Court.

In 1890, Hart joined the faculty of Howard University's law school with a starting salary of $1,500. He taught there for the next 25 years. He became a recognized authority on corporate law, criminal law, and torts. Along with fellow law school professor William Henry Richards, Hart secured $10,000 from Congress to build the law school's first building.

Hart augmented his income by working for the United States Treasury, United States Department of Agriculture, and as the Assistant Librarian of Congress at the Library of Congress from 1893 to 1897. Hart was the first black lawyer appointed as special U.S. District Attorney for the District of Columbia in 1889.

The Maryland Legislature enacted a Jim Crow Law in 1904 that required steamship lines and railroads to maintain separate but equal facilities. Once the segregation requirement went into effect on July 1, 1904, African-American ticket holders on the Philadelphia, Baltimore, and Wilmington Railroad Trains heading south from northern points had to move to the colored compartment after the train crossed the Mason–Dixon line.

A number of people were arrested in the following weeks, but the practical and legal workings of the Jim Crow Law got its first real test in the early autumn of 1904. William Henry Harrison Hart and his sister, Clementine Bartlett, refused to move to the "colored car." The conductor sent for the sheriff and "at the sight of the officer, the woman gracefully yielded and took her place in the car. The lawyer was given the choice of the proper car or jail, and refusing the former was escorted to a cell," the Cecil Whig reported.

Hart spent two days in the Elkton jail, charged with violating the separate car act. Found guilty by the Cecil County Circuit Court he was fined $50. He immediately filed an appeal with the Circuit Court. The lawyer added that if necessary, he would take the case all the way to the U.S., Supreme Court as the Jim Crow Law was not only unconstitutional but was also in conflict with the Interstate Commerce Law, the Baltimore Sun reported.

In this groundbreaking appeal to the higher court in 1904, Hart challenged Maryland's Jim Crow laws. He was traveling in a whites-only section of a railroad car when a conductor ordered him to move into the blacks-only car as the train crossed the Maryland state line. When the State vs. Hart made its way to the bench of the court of Appeals, the judges sustained the Jim Crow Law but held that the provisions of that measure cannot apply to interstate passengers as Hart argued. Hart was on a through train from New York to Washington so the decision of the lower court was reversed, but the law was sustained in Maryland. So long as Hart was crossing state lines (rather than engaged in intrastate travel), the racial segregation laws could not apply.

== Hart Farm School and Junior Republic for Dependent Colored Boys ==
In 1897 Hart started the Hart Farm School and Junior Republic for Dependent Colored Boys on 700 acres of land along the Potomac River near Fort Washington, Maryland, that he purchased from Senator Evarts. The school was capable of housing up to two hundred students.

== Niagara Movement ==
On July 11, 1905, Hart, along with twenty-eight other black intellectuals, including W. E. B. DuBois, founded the Niagara Movement with the drafting of the Niagara Movement's Declaration of Principles. It formally incorporated in 1906 and was the precursor organization to the NAACP in 1910.

== Personal life ==
A forty-seven-year-old Hart married the twenty-one-year-old, Mary M. Olney in Washington, D.C., on March 27, 1905. Hart lived at 216 Arthur Place N.W. in Washington, D.C., in 1902. Also in 1902, Hart had a thriving law practice that was located at 420 5th Street, N.W., Washington D.C. Hart had three children with Mary, William H. H. Hart (deceased) Jr., Clementine Hart (deceased), and one stillborn. Hart's descendants are numerous and many still reside in the Washington, D.C., area.

== Death ==
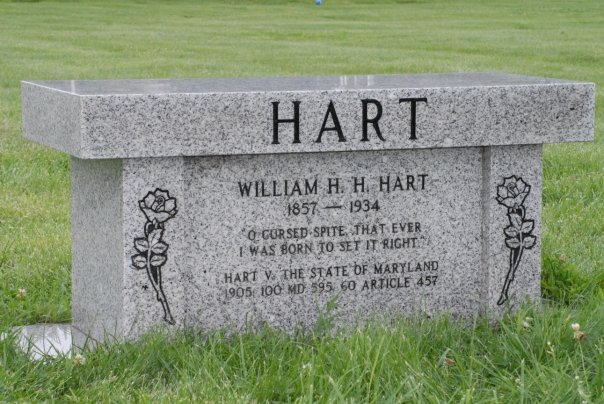
National Harmony Memorial Park by William D. Hart, 2005

Hart died in New York City on January 6, 1934. His body was transported to Washington, D.C., where he was interred at Columbian Harmony Cemetery. His remains were transferred to National Harmony Memorial Park in Landover, Maryland, when Columbian Harmony Cemetery closed in 1959.

== Bibliography ==
- Alexander, Shawn Leigh. An Army of Lions: The Civil Rights Struggle Before the NAACP. Philadelphia: University of Pennsylvania Press, 2012.
- Smith, J. Clay. Emancipation: The Making of the Black Lawyer, 1844-1944. Philadelphia: University of Pennsylvania Press, 1993.
- Smith, C. Fraser. Here Lies Jim Crow: Civil Rights in Maryland. Baltimore, Md.: Johns Hopkins University Press, 2008.
- Welke, Barbara Young. Recasting American Liberty: Gender, Race, Law, and the Railroad Revolution, 1865-1920. New York: Cambridge University Press, 2001.
- Gates Jr., Henry Lewis and Higginbotham, Evelyn Brooks. African American National Biography, Volume 4. New York: Oxford University Press, Inc., 2008.
- Hart, James M. Genealogy of Samuel Hartt of Lynn Mass. 1640-1903 and Eight Others and Their Descendants Pasadena, California: James M. Hart, 1903.
- Logan, Rayford and Michael R. Winston Dictionary of American Negro Biography New York: W. W. Norton and Company, Inc., 1982
