= Maria W. Stewart =

American teacher, journalist, and activist (1803–1879)

- Born: Maria Miller; 1803; Hartford, Connecticut, US
- Died: December 17, 1879 (aged 75–76); Washington, D.C., US
- Occupations: Teacher; journalist; lecturer; abolitionist; women's rights activist
- Spouse: James W. Stewart (m. 1826; died 1829)

Maria W. Stewart (née Miller) (1803 – December 17, 1879) was an African American writer, lecturer, teacher, and activist from Hartford, Connecticut. She is widely recognized as the first woman in the United States to give a public speech and the first American-born woman to speak publicly about abolition and women's rights, breaking barriers for both Black and female voices in the early 19th century.

Stewart's work appeared in The Liberator, where she published two influential pamphlets: "Religion and the Pure Principles of Morality, The Sure Foundation on Which We Must Build" (1831) (which urged the abolition of slavery and called for Black self-determination and autonomy) and "Meditations from the Pen of Mrs. Maria Stewart" (1832). Her brief but impactful public speaking career concluded after a controversial address in 1833, yet her advocacy was foundational for later reformers. After retiring from lecturing, Stewart continued her commitment to education and service, teaching in public schools and later serving as head matron at Freedmen's Hospital in Washington, D.C. Stewart remained a pioneer for justice and equality until her death in 1879.

== Early life ==
Maria Stewart was born Maria Miller in 1803 in Hartford, Connecticut to free African-American parents. By the age of five, she had lost both parents and was sent to live with a white minister and his family, where she worked as an indentured servant until around the age of 15. During this time, she received no formal education. After leaving the minister's household, she moved to Boston and worked as a domestic servant. There, she began attending Sabbath School, or Sunday School, where she developed a lifelong devotion to faith and religious education.

On August 10, 1826, she married James W. Stewart, an independent shipping agent in Boston, Massachusetts. Through her marriage, Stewart became a part of Boston's small free black upper middle class and became involved in some of the city's institutions. For example, she was involved with the Massachusetts General Colored Association which focused on the immediate abolition of slavery. After her husband's death in 1829, Stewart was denied any inheritance from his estate, which was a personal injustice that likely deepened her commitment to advocate for women's rights and racial equality.

== Public speaking ==
Maria Stewart was the first American woman to speak to a mixed audience of men and women (termed a "promiscuous" audience during the early 19th century). The audience was also both Black and white. Stewart was also the first African American woman to lecture on women's rights, focusing on the struggles of Black women, religion, and social justice. Recognized as an early voice in Black feminist thought during the Jim Crow era, Stewart also became the first African-American woman to call openly for the abolition of slavery.

Her public speaking career began after she published a pamphlet "Religion and the Pure Principles of Morality, The Sure Foundation on Which We Must Build" in 1831. Though deeply religious, Stewart referred to her addresses as "speeches" rather than "sermons." She delivered Religion and the Pure Principles of Morality to several Boston organizations, including the African American Female Intelligence Society, where she emphasized the role gender played in preventing spiritual growth among African Americans.

Stewart was influenced by abolitionist David Walker, whose Appeal to the Coloured Citizens of the World (1829) (focused on race relations) entitled urged Black Americans to rise up against oppression and demand their rights. His sudden death in 1830, just one year after Stewart's husband had died, prompted a significant "born again" spiritual experience for Stewart, fueling her devotion to "Africa, freedom, and God's cause." Rejecting violence, Stewart instead promoted African-American exceptionalism, emphasizing the bond she perceived between God and African Americans. Stewart advocated for social and moral advancement while protesting the social conditions faced by African Americans.

Stewart's public-speaking career lasted three years. She delivered her farewell lecture on September 21, 1833, at Boston's African Meeting House, now part of the Black Heritage Trail. Upon leaving Boston, she first moved to New York, Baltimore, and later Washington D.C., where she taught, remained active in reform circles, and eventually served as head matron of the Freedmen's Hospital and Asylum, later the medical school of Howard University. Stewart continued her lifelong commitment to justice and education until her death in 1879.

== Lectures ==
Between 1832 and 1833, she delivered four lectures, all printed by her friend and central figure of the abolitionist movement William Lloyd Garrison in The Liberator.

The first of her four lectures was given on September 21, 1832, at Franklin Hall in Boston. Titled, "Why sit ye here and die?," the lecture was presented to the New England Anti-Slavery Society. This lecture was a call to action from Stewart, using the metaphor to challenge African Americans, especially those who were free in the North, to fight for equality and not wait for others to secure their rights. In her demand for change and action, she states "how long shall the fair daughters of Africa be compelled to bury their minds and talents beneath a load of iron pots and kettles?." Stewart urges Black women to rise above the limits that are placed upon them by society and make a life of their own.

Elsewhere, she stated more directly the importance of education to the liberation of oppressed groups: "It is of no use for us to sit with our hands folded, hanging our heads like bulrushes, lamenting our wretched condition' but let us make a mighty effort, and arise, and proclaim our rights." Through this call, Stewart emphasized that education and self-improvement were essential for African Americans to claim their rightful place in society. She believed that gaining knowledge was essential to overcoming ignorance and dependence, urging both men and women to strengthen their minds and character to achieve true freedom.

She also criticizes the supposed differences between white and African-American women, arguing that such inequalities were not natural but rather the result of unequal opportunities. She points out that when white women were enjoying comfort and receiving an education, Black women were forced into physical labor and denied any intellectual development. Stewart challenged the belief that Black women were inherently inferior, instead insisting that equality was produced by opportunities and circumstances, not nature: "O, ye fairer sisters, whose hands are never soiled, whose nerves and muscles are never strained, go learn by experience! Had we had the opportunity that you have had to improve our moral and mental faculties, what would have hindered our intellects from being as bright, and our manners from being as dignified as yours?"

Notably, Stewart critiqued Northern treatment of African Americans at a meeting in which Northerners gathered to criticize and plan action against Southern treatment of African Americans. She challenged the supposed dichotomy between the inhumane enslavement of the South and the normal proceedings of capitalism in the North, arguing that the relegation of African Americans to service jobs was also a great injustice and waste of human potential. In doing so, she anticipated arguments about the intersection of racism, capitalism, and sexism that would later be advanced by womanist thinkers.

Her Christian faith strongly influenced Stewart. She often cited Biblical influences and the Holy Spirit, and implicitly critiqued societal failure to educate her and others like her:

Yet, after all, methinks there are no chains so galling as the chains of ignorance—no fetters so binding as those that bind the soul, and exclude it from the vast field of useful and scientific knowledge. O, had I received the advantages of early education, my ideas would, ere now, have expanded far and wide; but, alas! I possess nothing but moral capability—no teachings but the teachings of the Holy spirit.

— Maria Stewart, https://voicesofdemocracy.umd.edu/stewart-lecture-delivered-speech-text/

Maria W. Stewart delivered her final public lecture at the African Masonic Hall in Boston on February 27, 1833 titled, "An Address: African Rights and Liberty." Stewart was addressing a free Black audience, at a time when slavery was still legal in the South, and when free African Americans in the North were still facing harsh discriminations against them.

Stewart urged African Americans to pursue education and moral excellence as a path towards equality and respect. During her argument she emphasized that ignorance and dependency would only perpetuate oppression, saying, "It is not the color of the skin that makes the man or the woman, but it is the principles formed within the soul."

== Writings ==
In her writings, Stewart addressed the oppression of Black Americans. She declared, "Every man has a right to express his opinion. Many think, because your skins are tinged with a sable hue, that you are an inferior race of beings ... Then why should one worm say to another, Keep you down there, while I sit up yonder; for I am better than thou. It is not the color of the skin that makes the man, but it is the principle formed within the soul".

Stewart believed that education, particularly religious education, was essential to lifting Black people out of ignorance and poverty. She denounced the racist laws that prevented African Americans from accessing schools, the ballot, and other basic rights. Stewart urged Black Americans to develop their talents and intellect, live moral lives, and devote themselves to racial activism. Stewart challenged her audience to emulate the valor of the pilgrims and American revolutionaries in demanding freedom, and advised them to establish institutions such as grocery stores and churches to support their community.

Although her views were radical for the time and not always well received by her audience, Stewart remained committed. During a shifting economic and cultural landscape, she warned that moral complacency and spiritual decline would threaten the nation's democratic ideals.

Grounded in Christian principles, Stewart aimed to empower the Black community to rise above systemic injustice. Her advocacy for women and racial uplift provided a foundation for African American women to mobilize for a greater national and international discourse.

Some of her key writings include:

=== "Religion and the Pure Principles of Morality, the Sure Foundation on Which We Must Build" ===
In this writing Stewart argues that a stable and flourishing society must be grounded and moral principles. Stewart explains that religions provide the most reliable source of those principles. She emphasizes that moral behavior is something that cannot be sustained by laws or social pressure alone, but it is shaped by religious belief. Religion is something that is portrayed not just as a set of doctrines by a moral compass that influences and governs the way individuals use their resources. Stewart emphasizes that when people let religious values guide how they earn, spend and distribute wealth, society becomes more orderly and just.

=== "Mediations from the Pen of Mrs. Maria Stewart" ===
In this writing Stewart reflects on faith, morality, and the struggles of Black Americans in the early 19th century. This piece is a collection of reflection that blend Christian moral instruction with a call for Black empowerment. Stewart emphasized the necessary of faith and trust in God as the foundation of navigating hardships. She reflects on the injustices that are faced by African Americans, limiting their opportunities and dignity. Stewart urges her audience to pursue education, and self-improvement as acts of defiance adjacent the systems that designed to keep them subordinate. Throughout the work, she combines scriptural references with reflection of equality and pups. She positions Black Americans as individuals capable of greatness, when they provide both spiritual discipline and collection ambition.

== Evangelism ==
Maria W. Stewart was influenced heavily by the Bible and Christian imagery in her writings and speeches. She evangelized during a time when the education women, and especially of Black women, was frowned upon. She once wrote,

having lost my position in Williamsburg, Long Island, and hearing the colored people were more religious and God-fearing in the South, I wended my way to Baltimore in 1852. But I found all was not gold that glistened; and when I saw the want of means for the advancement of the common English branches, with no literary resources for the improvement of the mind scarcely, I threw myself at the foot of the Cross, resolving to make the best of a bad bargain ...

Stewart was shocked at the miserable conditions of African American people in Maryland, a slave state, where a relatively high percentage of Black people were free. She eventually took a job as a teacher where she taught reading, writing, spelling and arithmetic. She was paid 50 cents a month while white teachers were paid $1. Her salary was barely enough to cover her monthly expenses. She readily admitted she was not good at handling her finances and to some degree people took advantage.

Women evangelists were often very poor and leaned on the kindness of strangers, friends and religious leaders to help sustain them. One such friend went by the name of Elizabeth Keckley, a former slave, seamstress and civil rights activist she wrote of fondly, "There was a lady, Mrs. Keckley, I knew, formerly from Baltimore, who proved to be an ardent friend to me in my great emergency. ..." Stewart was born free and Keckley a slave, but both women saw a need to be active in the burgeoning civil rights movement of the late 19th century.

The preaching of God's word during the 1800s was seen in society as a male role even among some Black religious institutions. As one writer said: "women in the black churches were relegated to positions that posed no real threat to the power structure maintained by preachers, deacons, and other male leaders. Women were usually assigned roles of Sunday school teachers, exhorters, secretaries, cooks, and cleaners. Such positions paralleled those reserved for women within the domestic sphere of the home."

Stewart believed that she was called to do God's work even at great peril to herself. She used her platform to talk about racial injustices and sexism by highlighting the contradictions between the message of peace and unity preached from the pulpits of the white churches versus the reality of the slavery. According to one writer:

"For Stewart, this ... newly freed community ... barely one generation from slavery, yearning for a fully realized freedom rather than a nominal one. Given the small size of the free Black community, it is easy to assume solidarity, cohesion, and unquestioned allegiance to the Black church. But just as revolutionary Americans had to grapple with what it meant to be 'American,'... Blacks ... just 50 years from slavery in Massachusetts, were grappling with their identity as free people, and there were likely competing agendas being cast forth of what Blacks should 'do' and how they should operate."

Between January 7, 1832 and May 4, 1833, William Lloyd Garrison's newspaper, The Liberator, published six articles by Stewart. In these articles, Stewart spoke in two seemingly contradictory registers as she described God's interactions with humanity. On the one hand, she portrayed a gentle God who directed his angels to carry oppressed individuals "into Abraham's bosom [where] they shall be comforted"; on the other hand, she warned sinners—specifically white American sinners—of a wrathful and violent God who was on the verge of sending "horror and devastation" to the world. While these two images may seem paradoxical to contemporary readers, they reflect the connection between sympathy and violence that permeated Stewart's theology and structured her concept of Christian community. She believed God's compassion for suffering believers would motivate him to punish their tormenters and that African-American Christians should follow his example by protecting one another with force if necessary.

This juxtaposition of Christian mercy and retributive violence also points to the crucial but often minimized role of African-American women such as Stewart who were uniquely situated to collaborate with black nationalists and white abolitionists. As an important figure in radical political action, Stewart helps to better understand the multivalent forces that shaped resistance movements in the early nineteenth century.

== Impact and influence ==
Maria Stewart was an African-American activist, lecturer, and writer who made significant contributions to the abolitionist and women's rights movements. She was one of the first Black women to publicly address issues of race and gender, breaking barriers in a time when such outspokenness was rare and often dangerous.

Stewart is included in Daughters of Africa: An International Anthology of Words and Writings by Women of African Descent, edited by Margaret Busby (1992), the title of which is inspired by Stewart's 1831 declaration, in which she said:

O, ye daughters of Africa, awake! awake! arise! no longer sleep nor slumber, but distinguish yourselves. Show forth to the world that ye are endowed with noble and exalted faculties.

Additionally, Stewart is included in the first chapter of Words of Fire: An Anthology of African-American Feminist Thought, edited by Beverly Guy-Sheftall (1995), The two speeches by Stewart "Religion And The Pure Principles of Morality, The Sure Foundation On Which We Must Build" and "Lecture Delivered at Franklin Hall" were widely incorporated into a Black feminist tradition.

She argued for equal opportunity for Black Americans and spoke directly and publicly to other women, urging them to educate themselves in order to advocate for their rights and privileges. Stewart's work influenced future activists such as Sojourner Truth and Ida B. Wells and helped lay the groundwork for Black feminist thought. She played an important role in the growing movement of American women entering the political sphere through public speaking, alongside such activists as the Grimké sisters. Despite her brief time giving lectures, Stewart's efforts have had a lasting impact on the fields of womanist theology and feminist studies.

== Death ==
Stewart died at Freedmen's Hospital on December 17, 1879. She was originally buried in Graceland Cemetery, which closed two decades later after extensive litigation and most of the land used by the Washington Electric Railway. She was reinterred at Woodlawn Cemetery.

== Works ==
=== Works by Stewart ===
- Productions of Mrs. Maria W. Stewart presented to the First African Baptist Church and Society of the City of Boston. Boston: Friends of Freedom and Virtue, 1835. Reprinted from The Liberator, Vol. 2, No. 46 (November 17, 1832), p. 183.
  - "A Lecture at the Franklin Hall, Boston, September 21, 1832" (Productions of Mrs. Maria W. Stewart, pp. 51–56), in: Dorothy Porter (ed.), Early Negro Writing, 1760-1837, Black Classic Press, 1995; pp. 136–140.
  - "An Address delivered at the African Masonic Hall, Boston, February 27, 1833" (Productions of Mrs. Maria W. Stewart, pp. 63–72), Dorothy Porter (ed.), Early Negro Writing, 1760-1837, Black Classic Press, 1995; pp. 129–135. As "On African Rights and Liberty", in: Margaret Busby (ed.), Daughters of Africa, Ballantine Books, 1994, pp. 47–52.
- Meditations from the Pen of Mrs. Maria W. Stewart: presented to the First African Baptist Church and Society, in the city of Boston. Boston: Printed by Garrison and Knapp, 1879.

=== Works about Stewart ===
- Marilyn Richardson, Maria W. Stewart: America's First Black Woman Political Writer, Indiana University Press, 1988.
- Marilyn Richardson, "Maria W. Stewart," in Feintuch, Burt, and David H. Watters (eds), The Encyclopedia Of New England: The Culture and History of an American Region, Yale University Press, 2005.
- Marilyn Richardson, "Maria. W. Stewart", Oxford Companion to African American Literature. Oxford University Press, 1997, pp. 379–380.
- Marilyn Richardson, "'What If I Am A Woman?' Maria W. Stewart's Defense of Black Women's Political Activism", in Donald M. Jacobs (ed.), Courage and Conscience: Black & White Abolitionists in Boston, Indiana University Press, 1993.
- Rodger Streitmatter, "Maria W. Stewart: Firebrand of the Abolition Movement", Raising Her Voice: African-American Woman Journalists Who Changed History, The University Press of Kentucky, 1994, pp. 15–24.

== See also ==
- Sojourner Truth
- Abolitionism in the United States
- Boston Women's Heritage Trail
- List of abolitionists
