= Payne's Cemetery =

Cemetery in Washington, D.C., USA

- Interactive map of Payne's Cemetery

Details
- Established: 1851
- Location: Benning Ridge, Washington, D.C.
- Country: United States
- Coordinates: 38.885137°N 76.93435°W
- Type: secular and public; closed 1919
- Owned by: Payne's Cemetery Association of the District of Columbia
- Size: 13 acres (53,000 m^{2})
- No. of graves: 39,000
- The Political Graveyard: Payne's Cemetery

Payne's Cemetery was a 13-acre (53,000 m^{2}) cemetery located in the Benning Ridge neighborhood of Washington, D.C., in the United States. It was founded in 1851 as a privately owned secular cemetery open to the public, but it primarily served the city's African American community. The cemetery was declared abandoned by the city in 1966. About 2,000 bodies at Payne's Cemetery were reinterred at National Harmony Memorial Park cemetery in Prince George's County, Maryland. Two public schools and a recreation center were constructed atop the cemetery in the late 1960s, during which time hundreds of corpses were unearthed and summarily disposed of.

== About the cemetery ==
John Payne was a free African American man who owned a farm east of the Anacostia River. He had a wife, Ellen, and several children. Payne's primary occupation was as a carpenter, however, so he used 13 acres (53,000 m^{2}) of his land to establish a cemetery for African Americans in 1851. But it wasn't until 1896 that the Payne's Cemetery Association was chartered to own, manage, and maintain the cemetery.

During the late 1800s, the "big five" of Washington's Black cemeteries were Columbian Harmony, Payne's, Mount Olivet, Mount Zion, and Mount Pleasant. Although Payne's was among the top ten cemeteries for blacks every year at this time, it was poorly run. It was not until 1891 that proved capable of handling more than 300 interments a year.

There were 14,000 burials at Payne's between 1880 and 1919, but there were clearly many more people buried at Payne's that cemetery or official records showed. That's because there were numerous unmarked slave graves, unidentified interments alongside identified ones, and illegal or so-called "bootleg" burials—burials made in the dead of night without cemetery knowledge (a common practice within communities whose members could not afford the costs associated with official burials). This was particularly true of Payne's, which catered to working-poor or poor individuals. By one count, there were as many as 39,000 people buried at Payne's Cemetery.

Some time in the early to middle 1900s, Payne's Cemetery Association sold the graveyard to P.D. Badia. Burials at the cemetery ended in 1959. Badia later sold the cemetery in March 1961 to Louis H. Bell, a White real estate developer who purchased a number of abandoned and nearly abandoned African American cemeteries in the city. Bell claimed to have moved more than 37,000 bodies from the cemetery to National Harmony Memorial Park cemetery in Prince George's County, Maryland, between March and November 1961. As the graves were moved, Bell ordered more than 500 short tons (450 t) of fill dirt placed atop 12 acres (49,000 m^{2}) of the cemetery to smooth it out. Unfortunately, Bell did not move all the graves, and some family members complained that their loved ones were now buried under several feet of earth. After complaints were made to the Corporation Counsel of the city of Washington, D.C., Bell agreed to uncover these graves and restore the cemetery's plot boundaries so that families could find burial sites they owned.

In 1966, about 2,000 graves were transferred from Payne's Cemetery to National Harmony Memorial Park. Payne's Cemetery was declared abandoned by the city in the summer of 1966, and the graves moved by September 1967. Fletcher-Johnson Middle School and the Fletcher-Johnson Recreation Center opened on the site in 1978.

== Bibliography ==
- Richardson, Steven J. (1989). "The Burial Grounds of Black Washington: 1880-1919". Records of the Columbia Historical Society, Washington, D.C.: 304–326.
