= National Harmony Memorial Park =

Cemetery in Prince George's County, Maryland, US

- Interactive map of National Harmony Memorial Park

Details
- Established: July 1, 1962
- Location: Landover, Maryland, U.S.
- Country: United States
- Coordinates: 38.907532°N 76.881731°W
- Type: Private, secular
- Owned by: Service Corporation International
- Size: 142 acres (570,000 m^{2})
- Website: www.nationalharmony.com
- Find a Grave: National Harmony Memorial Park
- The Political Graveyard: National Harmony Memorial Park

National Harmony Memorial Park is a private, secular cemetery located at 7101 Sheriff Road in Landover, Maryland, in the United States. Although racially integrated, most of the individuals interred there are African American. In 1960, the 37,000 graves of Columbian Harmony Cemetery in Washington, D.C., were transferred to National Harmony Memorial Park's Columbian Harmony section. In 1966, about 2,000 graves from Payne's Cemetery in D.C. were transferred to National Harmony Memorial Park as well.

== History of the cemetery ==
Washington businessman Louis H. Bell owned 107.5-acre (435,000 m^{2}) Forest Lawn Cemetery on Sheriff Road in Landover, Maryland. Bell also owned Prince George's Nurseries, and planned to add an additional 65 acres (260,000 m^{2}) of nursery land to the cemetery. In nearby Washington, D.C., Columbian Harmony Cemetery had met its capacity. Established in 1859 by a burial society for free Blacks, it was the most active cemetery for Black residents from the 1880s to the 1920s. But by 1950 the cemetery ran out of room and stopped new burials. The lack of burials and a perpetual care endowment left the cemetery $3,000 in debt every year by 1956.

In 1957, Bell, who wished to develop the Columbian site as real estate, offered the owners of Columbian Harmony Cemetery a 25 percent stake in the new cemetery and offered to pay all relocation costs in exchange for the cemetery's property in D.C. Although Columbian Harmony rejected this offer, negotiations continued. Bell eventually agreed to also establish a perpetual care fund, designate a 30-acre (120,000 m^{2}) section of the cemetery as the "Harmony Section", and allowed the Columbian Harmony Cemetery's board to appoint half the members of the new board of directors of the new cemetery association.

Beginning in May 1960, approximately 37,000 graves were moved to National Harmony Memorial Park. The District of Columbia Department of Health had to draft and win approval of a whole new set of regulations to govern the relocations. A D.C. district court agreed to issue a single exhumation order, than review thousands of cases. All the heirs of those buried at Columbia Harmony Cemetery were contacted and their permission to move the graves secured. More than 100 workers exhumed, recrated in new coffins, moved, and reburied the dead. However, there were hundreds of graves moved every day; although it is seldom mentioned, many were just put in an unmarked mass site. The re-interments were completed on November 17, 1960. It was the largest cemetery move in the nation's capital, and cost $1 million.

Unfortunately, the relocation agreement did not cover the existing memorials and monuments, which would have required identifying remains, moving the markers, and burying each body with its corresponding marker, if any. This would have taken much more time. According to the Maryland Historical Trust, none of the original grave markers were retained. Furthermore, most of the remains at Columbian Harmony Cemetery were transferred and reburied without identifying which person was being reburied. The headstones were sold as scrap and used to secure the riverbank of the Stuart Plantation, a 1400 acre conservation easement site on the banks of the Potomac in King George County, Virginia. In 2016 the property was bought by Virginia State Senator Richard Stuart, a descendant of the original owners, who discovered the grave markers and sought the help of Virginia Gov. Ralph Northam in recovering them. A nonprofit organization will reclaim as many of the headstones as possible and send them to National Harmony, and related memorial markers will be placed in both Maryland and Virginia.

In 1966, about 2,000 graves were transferred from Payne's Cemetery to National Harmony Memorial Park. Payne's Cemetery, located at 4640 Benning Road SE, was a historic cemetery founded in 1851, when most cemeteries in the city were segregated. It was exclusively for African Americans. Payne's Cemetery was declared abandoned by the city in the summer of 1966, and the graves moved by September 1967.

Stewart Enterprises, a company based in New Orleans, Louisiana, purchased National Harmony Memorial Park in 1998. Stewart Enterprises agreed to retain most of the 1959 agreement with Columbian Harmony Cemetery, although Columbian Harmony was no longer permitted to name members to the cemetery's board of directors. Service Corporation International acquired Stewart Enterprises in 2013.

== Notable interments ==
Many nationally and locally famous people are interred at National Harmony Memorial Park. Many of their remains were transferred from Columbian Harmony Cemetery or Payne's Cemetery. For information about them see Columbian Harmony Cemetery; note that the exact location of the relocated remains of any particular individual is unknown.

Among those buried at National Harmony Memorial Park who were not originally buried elsewhere are:

- Leonard C. Bailey (1825-1918), entrepreneur and inventor
- Francine Barker (1947–2005), singer who was the original Peaches in the vocal group Peaches & Herb
- Alvin Childress (1907–1986), actor who played Amos Jones on the Amos 'n' Andy television series
- Henrietta Vinton Davis (1860–1941), actress and civil rights activist
- Christian Fleetwood (1840–1914), Medal of Honor recipient
- William Henry Harrison Hart (1857–1934), civil rights attorney
- Thomas R. Hawkins (1840–1870), Medal of Honor recipient
- Paul Jennings (1799-1874), slave who served as personal servant to President James Madison; freedman who published a memoir in 1865
- Henry Lincoln Johnson (1870–1925), recorder of deeds for Washington, D.C.
- Elizabeth Keckley (1818–1907), seamstress to Mary Todd Lincoln and civil rights activist
- William J. "Billy" Mitchell (1931–2002), former singer with The Clovers
- Henry Vinton Plummer (1844–1905), first African-American chaplain in the U.S. Army (originally interred at family plot in Bladensburg, Maryland)
- Philip Reid (c. 1820–1892), foundryman who oversaw the casting of the Statue of Freedom
- Hilyard Robinson (1899–1986), modernist architect and Howard University professor
- Alfred Kiger Savoy (1883–1964), educator and Assistant Superintendent for Colored Elementary Schools, District of Columbia Public Schools, 1932 to 1954
- Billy Stewart (1937–1970), scat-singing R&B and soul artist

== Bibliography ==
- Sluby, Paul E. Sr.; Wormley, Stanton Lawrence (2001). History of the Columbian Harmony Society and of Harmony Cemetery, Washington, D.C. Rev ed. Washington, D.C.: The Society. OCLC 48989364.
- Taylor, Elizabeth Dowling (2012). A Slave in the White House: Paul Jennings and the Madisons. New York: Palgrave Macmillan. p. 224. ISBN 9780230108936.
- Wilson, Scott (2016). Resting Places: The Burial Sites of More Than 14,000 Famous Persons. Jefferson, N.C.: McFarland & Company. ISBN 9781476625997.
