= Philip Reed (sculptor) =

African American enslaved craftsman (1820–1892)

- Born: 1820; South Carolina
- Died: February 6, 1892 (aged 71–72); Washington, D.C.
- Resting place: National Harmony Memorial Park in Landover, Maryland
- Other names: Philip Reid, before emancipation
- Occupation: Sculptor
- Notable work: Statues of George Washington and Andrew Jackson, and the Statue of Freedom

Philip Reed, known as Philip Reid before he was emancipated (c. 1820 – February 6, 1892), (Note: Philip's surname was spelled "Reid" while enslaved and in relation to his work. The surname "Reed" was used in public records after he was emancipated. The 2014 National Harmony Memorial Park plaque used the spelling "Reed", which he preferred and had chosen himself, after his emancipation in 1863, instead of "Reid" which was chosen by Mills in 1842 when he enslaved him. By the 1860s, Philip was listed as "Philip Reed" in city directories and census records as a "plasterer, according to Smolenyak (2009). The 1928 Congressional Record used the Reed spelling.) was an African American master craftsman who worked at the foundries of self-taught sculptor Clark Mills. There, historical monuments such as the 1853 equestrian statue of Andrew Jackson in Lafayette Square, near the White House in Washington, D.C., the 1860 equestrian statue of George Washington in Washington Circle, and the 1863 Statue of Freedom in Washington, D.C., were created.

He was born in c. 1820 into slavery in South Carolina's historic city of Charleston. Reed was already recognized for his talents in the foundry industry when he began working as an enslaved apprentice to Mills in 1842.

Reed was emancipated on April 16, 1862, under the District of Columbia Compensated Emancipation Act. After his emancipation, he assisted Mills in installing the Statue of Freedom atop the United States Capitol, which was completed on December 2, 1863. In the 1860s, after having worked at the foundry for almost two decades, Reed's skills in working with bronze casting were recognized. In 1928, Tennessee Representative Finis J. Garrett presented a paper honoring Reed for his "faithful service and genius", and describing the key role he had played in casting the statue of Freedom, that is now part of the Congressional Record.

== Personal life ==
He was born in c. 1820 into slavery in South Carolina and at about the age of 22, he was purchased by a sculptor, Clark Mills, in Charleston for $700 or $1,200. Seen by Mills to have an "evident talent for business", Reed became his apprentice. Reed remained enslaved to Mills for over twenty years. During that time, he did not learn to read or write. After he was freed his surname was spelled "Reed" in census and other public records.

Reed settled in Washington, D.C., living on 3rd and C Street SW near the National Mall. He married Jane Brown, a housekeeper, on June 3, 1862 and they had a son named Henry Reed about 1868. In 1879, he married Mary Marshall, a laundress.

Reed died on February 6, 1892, and after having been moved twice, his remains were interred at National Harmony Memorial Park in Landover, Maryland, in 1960. (Note: He was first buried in the Graceland Cemetery in a "marked plot in clear view of the Statue of Freedom"—"his most notable achievement". The cemetery closed in 1894 and his remains were moved to Columbian Harmony Cemetery, where there were about 37,000 graves of African Americans, including Paul Jennings and Elizabeth Keckley. In 1960, his remains and the rest of the cemetery's graves were moved to National Harmony Memorial Park in Landover, Maryland.) A memorial plaque honoring Philip Reed was unveiled on April 16, 2014—the 152nd anniversary of Emancipation in Washington, D.C. at the cemetery. It reads,

Philip Reed The slave who built the Statue of Freedom atop the U.S. Capitol died a free man on February 6, 1892 and is buried here at National Harmony Memorial Park.

— Carol Morello, Washington Post, 2014

== Enslaved craftsman ==
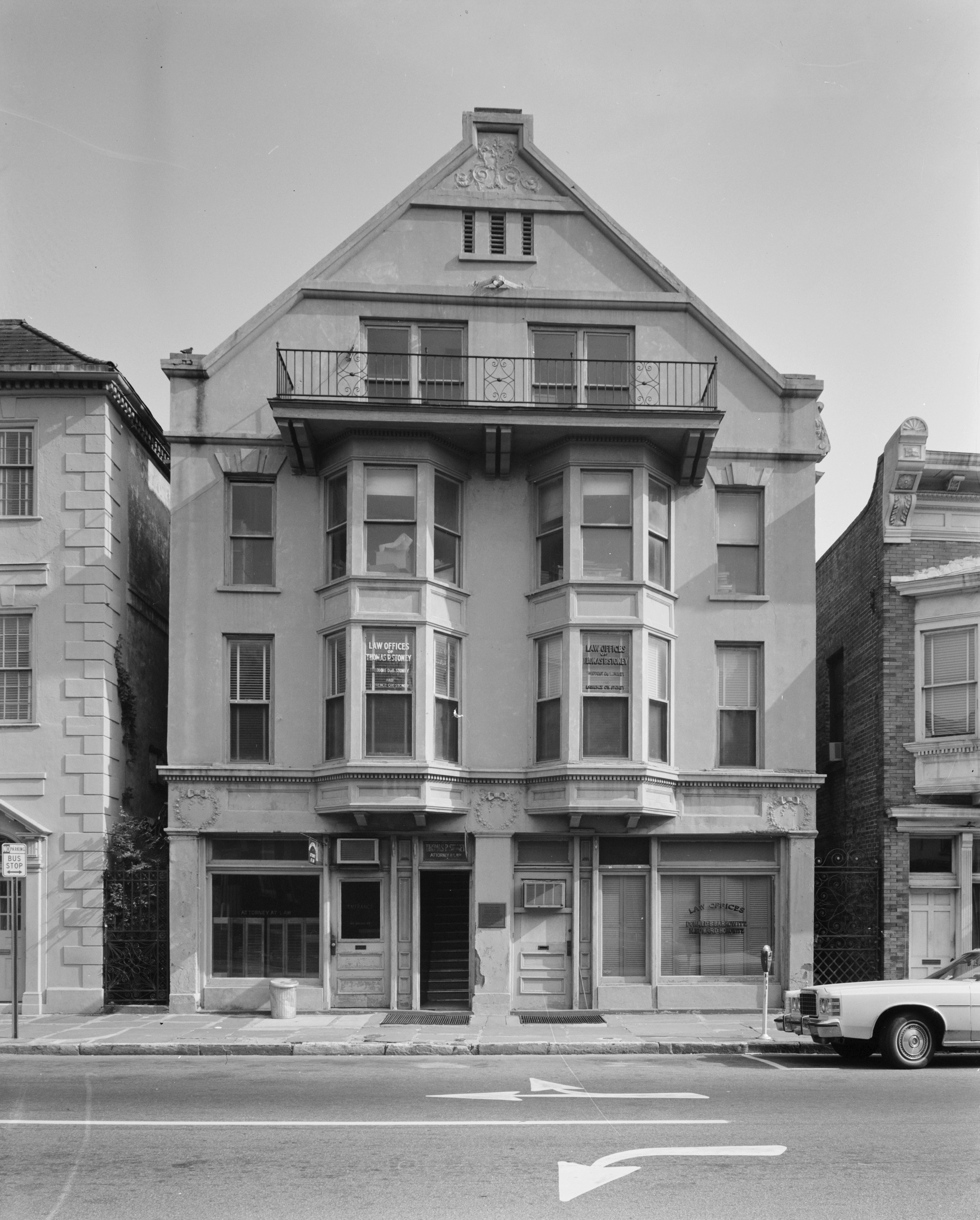
The Clark Mills Studio, 51 Broad Street, Charleston, South Carolina

The Clark Mills Studio, #51 Broad Street, in Charleston, South Carolina. North Broad Street elevation. At the time that Reed was purchased to become Clark Mill's apprentice, Charleston had more skilled craftsmen and enslaved craftsmen apprentices than any other city in the country. Generally, craftsmen had some freedom that was not afforded to domestic and agricultural enslaved people. Reed traveled with Mills to work. He may have had been able to keep a portion of earnings if he was hired out to wealthy planters. As a craftsman, he may have also been allowed to shop for materials and meet free and enslaved African Americans in his community.

Clark Mills lived in Charleston at 51 Broad Street, where he had his studio. Reed's on-the-job training included plastering and sculpting. He also learned basic engineering. After receiving commissions in Washington, D.C., Mills established a residence and studio on Bladensburg Road, NE in the District of Columbia in 1860.

== Emancipation ==
Reed was emancipated in 1863, after President Abraham Lincoln signed the District of Columbia Compensated Emancipation Act on April 16, 1862. When Mills petitioned for compensation, a right afforded to district slave owners, Reed was described as a healthy 42-year-old man who was a good, healthy workman. He further stated that Reed demonstrated "evident talent for the business in which [Mills] was engaged" at his steel foundry. (Note: Mills petitioned for compensation for eleven slaves, including Philip Reed. His description of Reed (Reid) that he submitted with the Petition said that Reed was "aged 42 years, mullatto [sic] color, short in statue, in good health, not prepossessing in appearance but smart in mind, a good workman in a foundry…" Mills had claimed $1,500 for Reed, explaining that he had paid $1,200 for Reed in 1842 in Charleston, South Carolina. Mills said, that although Reed was a youth at that time, he had already demonstrated "evident talent for the business in which [Mills] was engaged"—his steel foundry. Mills asked $1500 for Reed, but received only $350.40.)

After he was emancipated, Reed worked as a plasterer in Washington, D.C.

== Works ==
=== Equestrian statue of Andrew Jackson (1853) ===
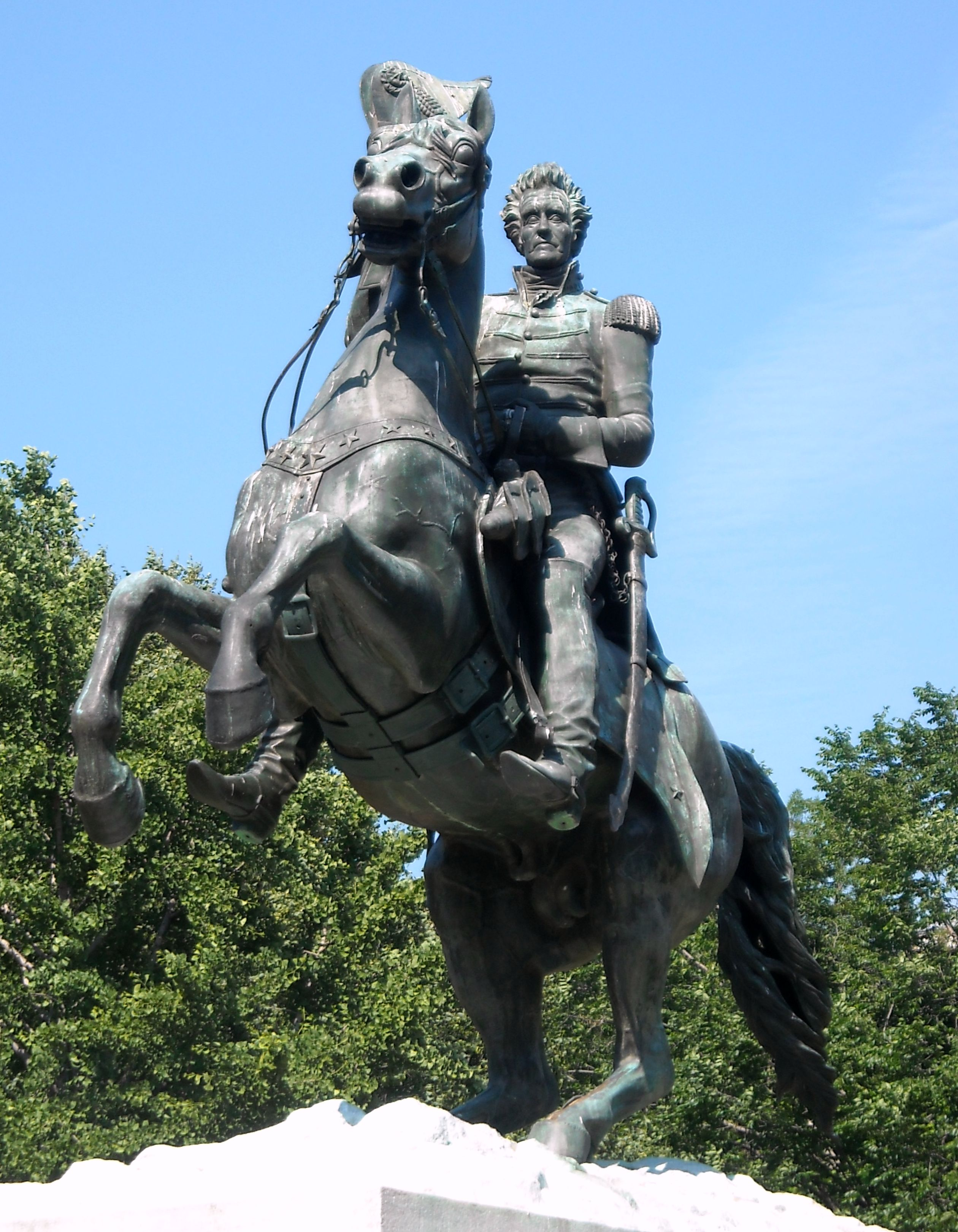
Equestrian statue of Andrew Jackson in Washington, D.C.

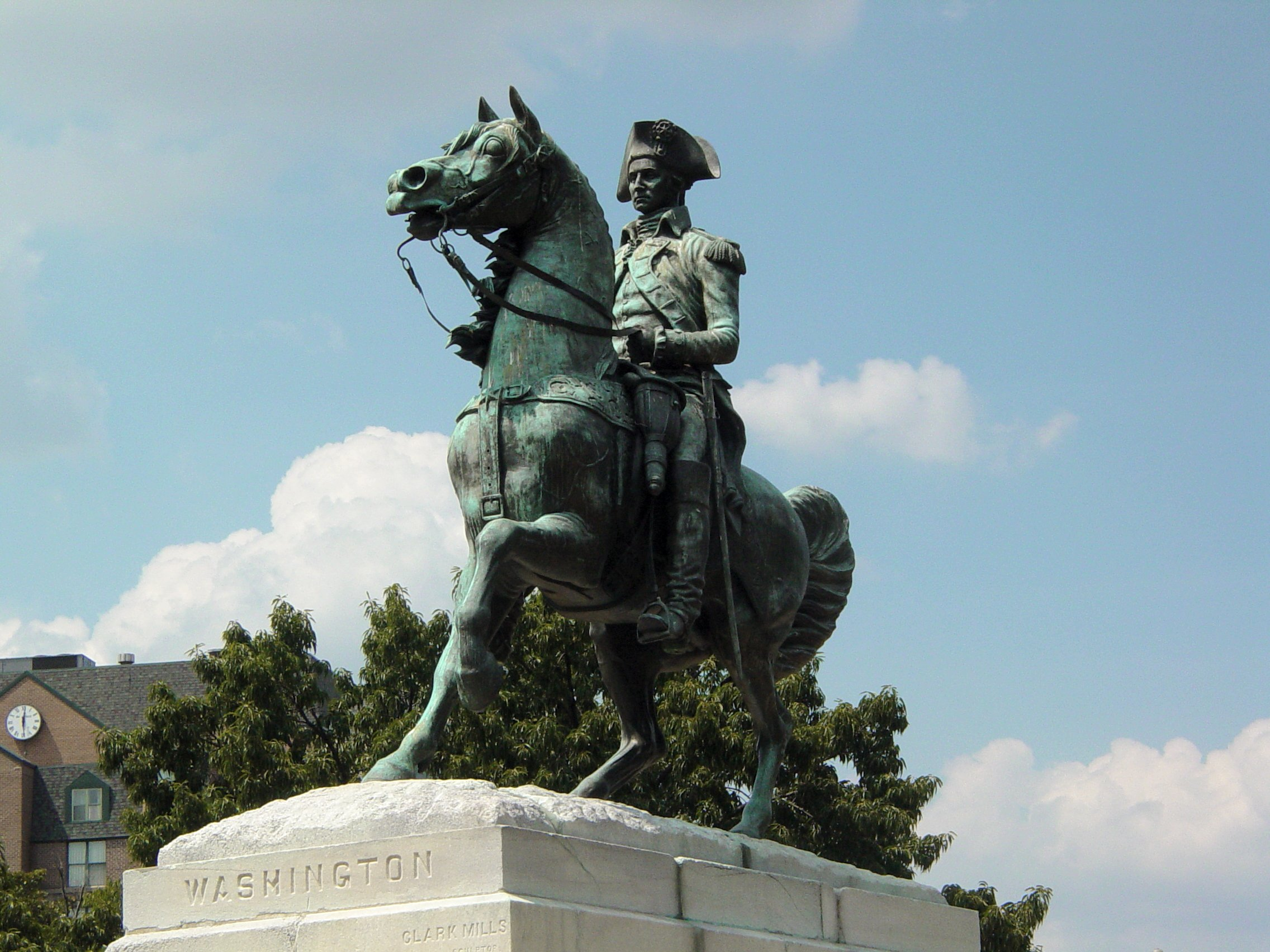

In 1848, the Jackson Monument Committee commissioned Mills, a self-taught sculptor, to create the equestrian statue of Andrew Jackson which is now in Lafayette Square, near the White House in Washington, D.C.

Mills moved to Washington after winning the competition and brought Reed and his other workmen with him. They erected a temporary foundry south of the White House. Mills with the assistance of Reed and laborers, produced six castings of the equestrian statue. In 1852, the casting was complete. The Architect of the Capitol said that they had produced "first bronze statue ever cast in America" through "trial and error". This "accomplishment was extraordinary due to the absence of any formal training of any of the participants." It has been described as the first equestrian statue made in America, and possibly the first equestrian statue of a horse rearing on two legs in which no additional support was added.

=== Equestrian statue of George Washington (1860) ===
The $60,000 equestrian statue was executed by Mills in his studio and foundry. The statue was dedicated in 1860, by then President James Buchanan.

=== The Statue of Freedom (1863) ===
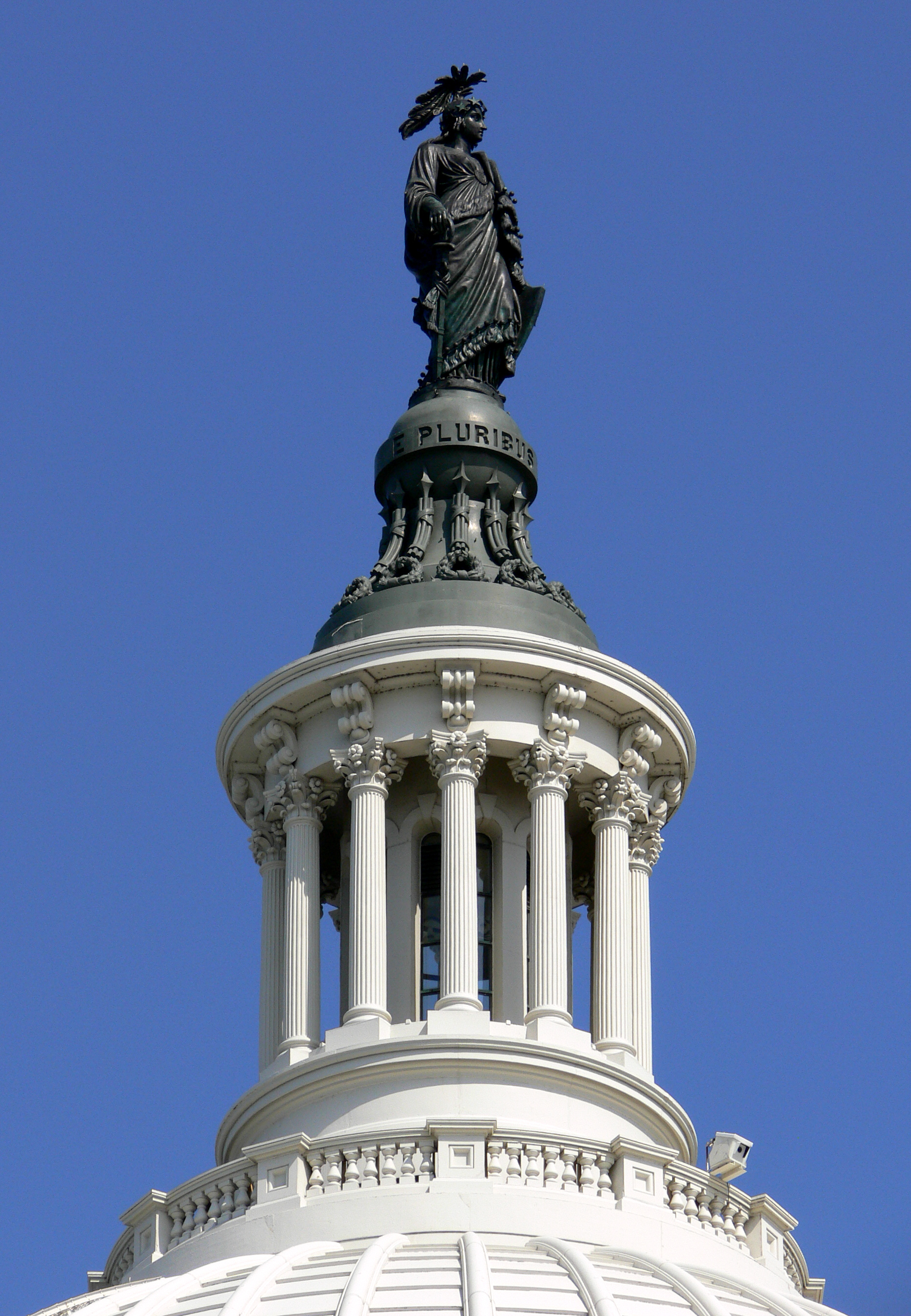

Largely because of the impact of the equestrian statues, in May 1860, Jefferson Davis, then-Secretary of War under President Franklin Pierce—who was responsible for public works including the expansion of the U.S. Capitol—awarded the contract to cast Thomas Crawford's Freedom statue to Mills.

Commissioned in 1855, the initial full-size plaster model of Freedom was completed by American sculptor Crawford in his studio in Rome, Italy. He died suddenly in 1857. A plaster model was cast and divided into five main sections for transport in separate crates. Crawford's widow shipped the model to Washington where it was to be cast into bronze. The crates arrived in late March 1859. An Italian craftsman was hired to assemble the five sections and it was put on display in the Old Hall of the House, now National Statuary Hall.

The fragile full-scale plaster model needed to be separated again into its five main sections to move it from the old House Chamber to Mills' foundry for casting. According to Mills' son Fisk, the Italian artisan refused to dismantle it until he got a major raise and a long-term contract. He had covered the seams of the sections with a layer of plaster that made them impossible to detect. He thought he was the only one capable of separating the delicate sections without harming them. Reed was able to find the seams by the ingenious use of an iron ring attached to the head of the figure and a block and tackle. He gently lifted the huge plaster model enough to crack the seals at the seams so he could reach the bolts inside. The statue was successfully separated into its five sections and carefully transported to Mills' Foundry.

Mills and his workmen began casting the statue in June 1860 at Mills Foundry—a large octagon-shaped studio and foundry on Bladensburg Road NE, District of Columbia. The government rented the foundry for $400 a month and supplied the materials, fuel and labor to cast the statue. Because of this arrangement, the names of the craftsmen and laborers were recorded each day in Mills' monthly report. Philip Reed was listed as a "laborer". There is no evidence that any of other men listed as laborers were black or enslaved. Mills received the government payment for Reed's work, which amounted to $1.25 a day, with the exception of Sundays, when Reed was paid directly. The other workmen were paid $1 a day. Only Philip Reed was paid directly by the government for working on 33 Sundays.

The work on Freedom continued against the backdrop of the American Civil War (1861–1865). On December 2, 1863, the "final piece of the iconic Statue of Freedom" was installed "atop the new Capitol Dome" amid great celebration and a 35-gun salute.

The 38th Congress (1863–1865) convened five days after Freedom had been installed, to "face and settle the most important questions of the century", and "passed the Thirteenth Amendment to the United States Constitution, which—when adopted by the states—abolished slavery and involuntary servitude.

== Legacy ==
In 1863, with the Statue of Freedom newly installed on the Capital, a newspaper correspondent wrote,

The black master-builder lifted the ponderous uncouth masses and bolted them together, joint by joint, piece by piece, till they blended into the majestic 'Freedom'.... Was there a prophecy in that moment when the slave became the artist and with rare poetic justice, reconstructed the beautiful symbol of freedom for America?

The Senate Historical Office reprinted the quote in their tribute to Reed, "Philip Reid [sic] and the Statue of Freedom" as part of their series, The Civil War: The Senate's Story.

During the 70th United States Congress in 1928, Tennessee Representative, Finis J. Garrett, read a paper and poem by William A. Cox

... the facts are that [Freedom's] successful taking apart and handling in parts as a model was due to the faithful service and genius of an intelligent negro in Washington named Philip Reed, a mulatto slave owned by Mr. Clark Mill, and that much credit is due him for his faithful and intelligent services rendered in modeling and casting America's superb Statue of Freedom, which kisses the first rays of the aurora of the rising sun as they appear upon the apex of the Capitol's wonderful dome.

— William A. Cox, Congressional Record

The Architect of the Capitol described Reed as the "single best known enslaved person associated with the Capitol’s construction history".

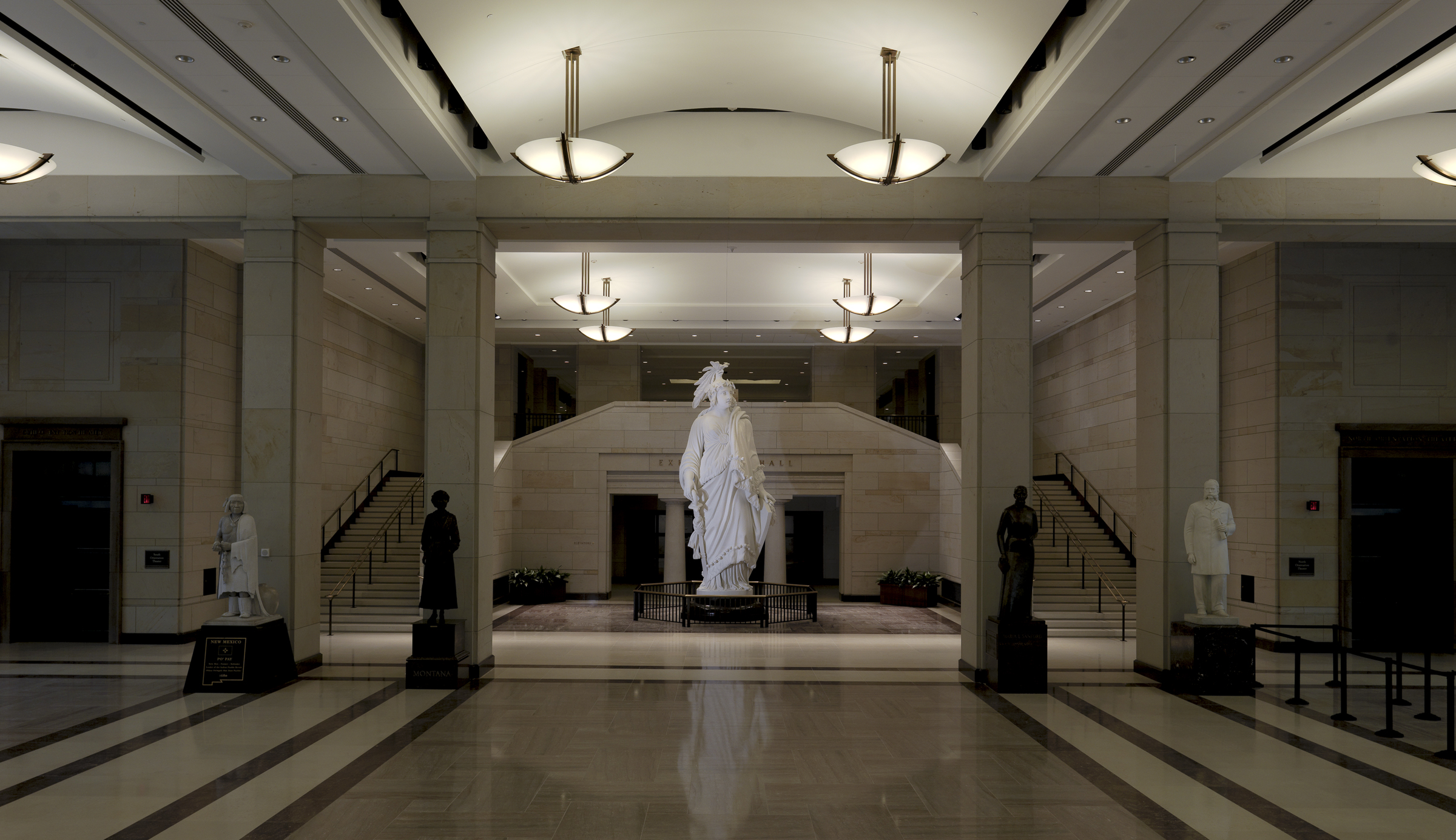
Emancipation Hall at the Capitol Visitor Center. The 1857 plaster cast of the Statue of Freedom is in the center flanked by stairs which lead to the Capitol itself.

Reed was honored for his role to create the capitol dome at the Emancipation Hall at the Capitol Visitor Center along with the plaster cast of the Statue of Freedom. Enslaved laborers who built the Capitol building were also honored.
