= Columbian Harmony Cemetery =

African-American cemetery in Washington, DC

- Interactive map of Columbian Harmony Cemetery

Details
- Established: 1859
- Closed: 1960
- Location: Brentwood, Washington, D.C.
- Country: United States
- Coordinates: 38°55′12″N 76°59′36″W
- Type: Closed
- Owned by: Columbian Harmony Society, Inc.
- Size: 29 acres (120,000 m^{2})
- No. of graves: 37,000

Columbian Harmony Cemetery was an African-American cemetery that formerly existed at 9th Street NE and Rhode Island Avenue NE in Washington, D.C., in the United States. Constructed in 1859, it was the successor to the smaller Harmoneon Cemetery in downtown Washington. All graves in the cemetery were moved to National Harmony Memorial Park in Landover, Maryland, in 1959. The cemetery site was sold to developers, and a portion used for the Rhode Island Avenue – Brentwood Washington Metro station.

== History ==
=== Formation and early years ===
The Columbian Harmony Society was a mutual aid society formed on November 25, 1825, by free African Americans to aid other black people. On April 7, 1828, it established the "Harmoneon," a cemetery exclusively for members of the society. This was a 1.3 acres (5,300 m^{2}) cemetery bounded by 5th Street NW, 6th Street NW, S Street NW, and Boundary Street NW. Burials began in 1829.

On June 5, 1852, the Council of the City of Washington in the District of Columbia passed a local ordinance that barred the creation of new cemeteries anywhere within Georgetown or within the area bounded by Boundary Street (northwest and northeast), 15th Street (east), East Capitol Street, the Anacostia River, the Potomac River, and Rock Creek. A number of new cemeteries were therefore established in the "rural" areas in and around Washington: Columbian Harmony Cemetery in D.C.; Gate of Heaven Cemetery in Silver Spring, Maryland; Glenwood Cemetery in D.C.; Mount Olivet Cemetery in D.C.; and Woodlawn Cemetery in D.C.

As Harmoneon quickly filled, the society was forced to find new burial grounds. It acquired on July 1, 1857, a 17 acres (69,000 m^{2}) tract bounded by Rhode Island Avenue NE, Brentwood Road NE, T Street NE, and the railroad tracks of the Capital Subdivision of the Baltimore and Ohio Railroad. Transferral of graves was completed in 1859. It sold the old Harmoneon site for $4,000. An 18 acres (73,000 m^{2}) tract adjacent to the Columbian Harmony Cemetery was purchased in the summer of 1886. From the early 1880s to the 1920s, Columbian Harmony Cemetery was the most active black cemetery in Washington, with 21.8 percent of all African-American burials occurring there. It never ranked lower than fourth in total African-American burials, and between 1892 and 1919 it was number one in every year but one. In 1895 alone, one-third of Washington's blacks were buried there. Columbian Harmony was one of the "big five" of black cemeteries in the District of Columbia. By 1900 landscaping and roads were added throughout the cemetery. A chapel was built in 1899, and a caretaker's lodge in 1912.

=== Management troubles ===
Columbian Harmony Cemetery was filling so rapidly that its owners considered purchasing a new cemetery outside the District of Columbia. By 1901, it held 10,000 graves. In 1929, the society purchased 44.75 acres (181,100 m^{2}) near Landover, Maryland, for $18,000. Some of the owners of existing burial plots sued in 1949 to prevent relocation of graves. Although some burials took place at the new cemetery, no grave relocations took place. In 1950, the society stopped new burials at Columbian Harmony Cemetery. By this time, at least 400 African American veterans, nearly all of them former United States Colored Troops, were buried there. In 1953, the society relocated the few graves at Huntsville to a nearby cemetery and sold its property for $178,000 to a real estate development company.

The lack of new burials left the cemetery in a difficult financial situation. The cemetery was experiencing an annual loss of $3,000 a year.

=== Closure and relocation of graves ===
In 1957, real-estate investor Louis N. Bell offered to buy Columbian Harmony Cemetery. Bell informed the society that he would expand his 107.5 acres (435,000 m^{2}) Forest Lawn Cemetery (which was near the society's former property in Landover) by 65 acres (260,000 m^{2}). He offered the society a 25 percent stake in the new cemetery and to pay all relocation costs in exchange for the property in D.C. Although the society rejected this offer, negotiations continued. Bell eventually agreed to also establish a perpetual care fund, designate a 30-acre (120,000 m^{2}) section of the cemetery as the "Harmony Section", and allowed the society to appoint half the board of the new cemetery association.

Beginning in May 1960, approximately 37,000 graves were moved to National Harmony Memorial Park. The District of Columbia Department of Health had to draft and win approval of a whole new set of regulations to govern the mass relocation. A D.C. district court agreed to issue a single exhumation order, rather than review thousands of cases. All the heirs of those buried at Columbia Harmony Cemetery were contacted and their permission to move the graves secured. More than 100 workers exhumed, recrated in new coffins, moved, and reburied the dead. The re-interments were completed on November 17, 1960. It was the largest cemetery move in the nation's capital, and cost $1 million.

However, to move 37,000 graves between May and November 1960 means that hundreds were moved every day, and there was no time to "recrate them in new coffins", even had 37,000 coffins been available. Many were reburied in a mass grave. Unfortunately, the relocation agreement did not cover the existing memorials and monuments, which would have required identifying remains, moving the markers, and burying each body with its corresponding marker, if any (making a mass grave impossible). This would have taken much more time. According to the Maryland Historical Trust, none of the original grave markers were retained. Furthermore, most of the remains at Columbian Harmony Cemetery were transferred and reburied without identifying which person was being reburied. The headstones were sold as scrap and used to secure the riverbank of the Stuart Plantation, a 1400 acre conservation easement site on the banks of the Potomac in King George County, Virginia. In 2016 the property was bought by Virginia State Senator Richard Stuart, a descendant of the original owners, who discovered the grave markers and sought the help of Virginia Gov. Ralph Northam in recovering them. A nonprofit organization will reclaim as many of the headstones as possible and send them to National Harmony, and related memorial markers will be placed in both Maryland and Virginia. It brought to light a historic injustice in D.C.

When the Rhode Island Avenue – Brentwood Metro station was constructed in 1976, workers discovered that not all the bodies had been exhumed. At least five coffins were unearthed, and numerous bones. A plaque was affixed to a column near one of the station's entrances to commemorate the former cemetery. When a parking lot at the site was renovated in 1979, more bones and bits of cloth and coffins were unearthed.

== Headstone controversy ==
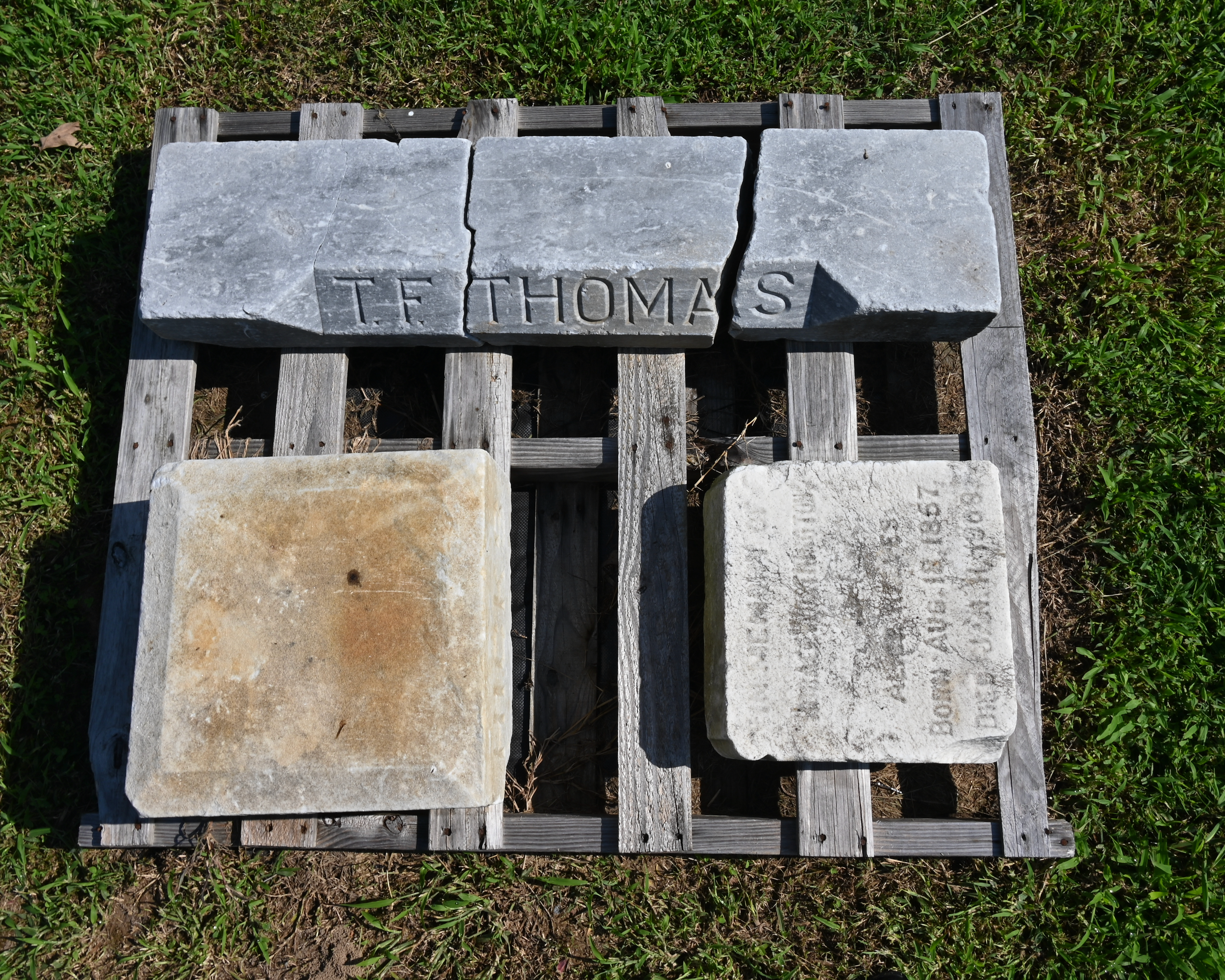
Retrieved headstones from Columbian Harmony Cemetery, seen in August 2021

The relocation agreement did not cover the existing memorials and monuments. According to the Maryland Historical Trust, none of the original grave markers were retained. Furthermore, most of the remains at Columbian Harmony Cemetery were transferred and reburied without identifying which person was being reburied. Grave markers were sold as scrap.

The fate of many of the original markers remained a mystery for almost a half-century. In 2009, hikers found a large number of headstones in the riprap lining the banks of the Potomac River, on privately owned land near Caledon State Park in King George County, Virginia. Virginia State Senator Richard Stuart, who bought the land in 2016, enlisted Virginia historians to trace the origin of the headstones; they were determined to have come from Columbian Harmony.

Because the headstones were adjacent to the state park, the Virginia Department of Conservation and Recreation could only turn them over to a nonprofit. With the assistance of Virginia Governor Ralph Northam, an agreement was signed by the state of Virginia, state of Maryland, the District of Columbia, and the History, Arts, and Science Action Network (HASAN, a nonprofit based in Lynchburg, Virginia). The grave markers are planned to be turned over to the nonprofit, and National Harmony has agreed to allow the nonprofit to place them on the appropriate graves at the cemetery. The two organizations are also working to create a memorial garden inside the main gate of the cemetery. Stuart said he will work to create a parklike memorial along the Potomac to recognize any headstones that cannot be reclaimed. The government of the District of Columbia said it will assist in researching the history of those buried at Columbian Harmony.

As of February 2021, only 55 headstones of the estimated thousands had been recovered.

== Notable interments ==
A number of nationally and locally important African Americans were buried at Columbian Harmony Cemetery. Among them was the first African-American D.C. firefighter (whose name was not known) to die in the line of duty. Other notable interments included:

- Lucy Addison (1861–1937), educator
- Sandy Alexander (1818–1902), co-founder, First Baptist Church of Washington
- Osborne Perry Anderson (1830–1871), only surviving African-American member of John Brown's raid on Harpers Ferry. Grave site unknown.
- George Bell (1761–1843), co-founder of the first African-American school in Washington, D.C.
- George Brown (?–1897), the "Black Sousa" who led the Capital City Band
- Henry Brown (?–1866), White House assistant steward formerly enslaved by U.S. President Andrew Johnson
- Solomon G. Brown (1829–1906), first African-American employee at the Smithsonian Institution.
- John F. Cook Jr. (1833–1910), a prominent businessman and Howard University trustee from one of Washington D.C.'s most wealthy nineteenth century African-American families
- Helen Appo Cook (1837–1913), founder of the Colored Women's League of Washington, D.C. and noted women's club leaders
- Henrietta Vinton Davis, (1860–1941) actress, elocutionist, dramatist, impersonator and high-ranking member of the Universal Negro Improvement Association and African Communities League
- Sherman H. Dudley (1872 – 1940) African-American vaudeville performer and theatre entrepreneur.
- Christian Fleetwood (1840–1914), Medal of Honor recipient
- William Henry Harrison Hart (1857–1934), co-founder of the Niagara Movement (predecessor of the National Association for the Advancement of Colored People
- Thomas R. Hawkins (1840–1870), Medal of Honor recipient
- Emanuel D. Molyneaux Hewlett (1850–1929), civil rights activist and Washington, DC's first African American justice of the peace.
- William James Howard (1854-1925) former slave, pastor, Zion Baptist Church
- Paul Jennings (1799–1874), former slave, personal servant to James Madison, antislavery activist, author
- Henry Lincoln Johnson (1871–1925), Republican National Committeeman from Georgia
- Robert Johnson (1870–1903), pastor, Metropolitan Baptist Church
- Elizabeth Keckley (1818–1907), former slave, seamstress to Abraham Lincoln, civic activist, and author
- Robert Pelham Jr. (1859–1943), journalist and federal government employee
- Philip Reid (c. 1820–1892), foundryman who oversaw the casting of the Statue of Freedom
- Mary Ann Shadd (1823–1893), anti-slavery activist, first black woman publisher in North America, first woman publisher in Canada
- William Syphax (1825-1891), first President of the Board of Trustees of Colored Schools of Washington and Georgetown
- Robert Heberton Terrell (1857–1925), second African-American judge in Washington, D.C.
- William W. Whipps (?–1940), Black pharmacist and co-founder of the Washington Association of Colored Druggists
- James Wormley (1819–1884), owner of the Wormley Hotel, and only African-American present when Abraham Lincoln died

== See also ==
- Laurel Cemetery, an African-American cemetery in Baltimore, Maryland that suffered the same fate during the same time period

== Bibliography ==
- Richardson, Steven J. "The Burial Grounds of Black Washington: 1880–1919." Records of the Columbia Historical Society. 52 (1989), pp. 304–326.
- Savage, Beth L. and Shull, Carol D. African American Historic Places. Washington, D.C.: Preservation Press, 1994.
- Sluby Sr. Paul E. and Wormley, Stanton Lawrence. History of the Columbian Harmony Society and of Harmony Cemetery, Washington, D.C. Rev ed. Washington, D.C.: The Society, 2001.
- Taylor, Elizabeth Dowling (2012). A Slave in the White House: Paul Jennings and the Madisons. New York: Palgrave Macmillan. ISBN 978-0230108936.
