= Leonard C. Bailey =

American entrepreneur, inventor and banker

Leonard C. Bailey (c. 1825 - September 1, 1918) was an African-American entrepreneur, inventor, and banker. He founded one of the first African-American banks in the United States.

Bailey was born in about 1825 to a free African-American family. Growing up in poverty, Bailey worked as a barber and built up a chain of barbershops in Washington, D.C.

Bailey invented and received patents for a series of devices, many designed for military or government use. These included a collapsible, folding bed designed for easy storage and portability, an innovation adopted by the U.S. military; a rapid mail-stamping machine used by the U.S. Postal Service; a device to shunt trains to different tracks; and a hernia truss adopted into wide use by the U.S. Army Medical Board. Bailey had to escape from a military camp after there was an attempt to capture him as a slave while he was dropping off his inventions. These inventions provided him with a sizable income.

Bailey helped establish the Capital Savings Bank of Washington, D.C., one of the first African-American owned banks in the U.S. During the Panic of 1893, the bank maintained its solvency by obtaining a personal loan from a national bank.

Bailey was a member of the first mixed-race jury in Washington, D.C., which found Millie Gaines not guilty of murder by reason of insanity. He served as a member of the board of directors of the Manassas Industrial School for Colored Youth where a residence hall was named after him.

Bailey died on September 1, 1918, of a sudden illness. He was buried in what is now known as the National Harmony Memorial Park in Largo, Maryland.
