= Eastern Methodist Cemetery =

Cemetery in Washington, D.C

- Interactive map of Eastern Methodist Cemetery

Details
- Established: 1824
- Location: Washington, D.C.
- Country: United States
- Coordinates: 38.883508°N 76.979905°W
- Type: Methodist and public; closed 1892
- Owned by: Fourth Street Methodist Church
- Size: 4 acres (16,000 m^{2})
- No. of graves: 3,000
- Find a Grave: Eastern Methodist Cemetery

Eastern Methodist Cemetery, also known as Old Ebenezer Cemetery and Ebenezer Cemetery, was a 4-acre (16,000 m^{2}) cemetery located in the Hill East neighborhood of Washington, D.C., in the United States.

It was founded in 1824 as a privately owned Methodist cemetery open to the public. (The earliest interment at Eastern Methodist came before the cemetery was incorporated. That was Ely Drown, who was buried there on August 18, 1823.) Its owner was the Fourth Street Methodist Church at Ebenezer Station (hence the nickname "Ebenezer Cemetery"). The cemetery was located one a city block bounded by D, E, 17th, and 18th Streets SE. It was across the street from and north of Congressional Cemetery. The cemetery was designed to hold 1,830 burial plots. But because of the cemetery's popularity, there were multiple burials in each grave, and by the 1890s the cemetery held more than 3,000 bodies.

During the roughly 70 years in which the cemetery was in operation, many of the leading citizens of Hill East, Capitol Hill, Kingman Park, and Atlas District were buried at Eastern Methodist Cemetery. The cemetery was never in good financial condition, however. The price of burial plots was too low to permit the cemetery to establish a perpetual care fund.

Eastern Methodist Cemetery was built on marshy ground, however, and it was not very suitable as a burial ground. About 1890, the cemetery's trustees proposed closing the cemetery. To finance the disinterment of remains, the cemetery would be subdivided and sold for building lots. Lotholders, however, rejected the proposal. The trustees then sought a legal solution. In 1891, Congress enacted legislation allowing Eastern Methodist Cemetery to remove all bodies in the cemetery and subdivide and sell the land to finance their reinterment elsewhere. Some remains were claimed by family members. The Fourth Street Methodist Church agreed to disinter and box these remains, and reinter them at church expense at whatever local cemetery the family chose. Remains which went unclaimed were interred in mass graves at Congressional Cemetery. Although there initially was opposition among lotholders against the cemetery's closure, no lawsuit emerged.

Disinterments commenced at the cemetery on October 1, 1892. By October 4, about 50 bodies had been removed from Eastern Methodist Cemetery, and cemetery officials were predicting that the cemetery would be cleared by the end of the year. Cemetery officials said that they had located nearly every grave listed in the cemetery's lot book, and full clearance of bodies from the grounds was almost certain. As of November 3, about 1,000 bodies remained to be unearthed, but officials said they were sure to have the work finished within three more weeks.

== Bibliography ==
- Proctor, John Claggett; Black, Frank P.; Williams, E. Melvin (1930). Washington, Past and Present: A History. New York: Lewis Historical Publishing Co.
