= Statue of Freedom =

Sculpture by Thomas Crawford on top of the US Capitol

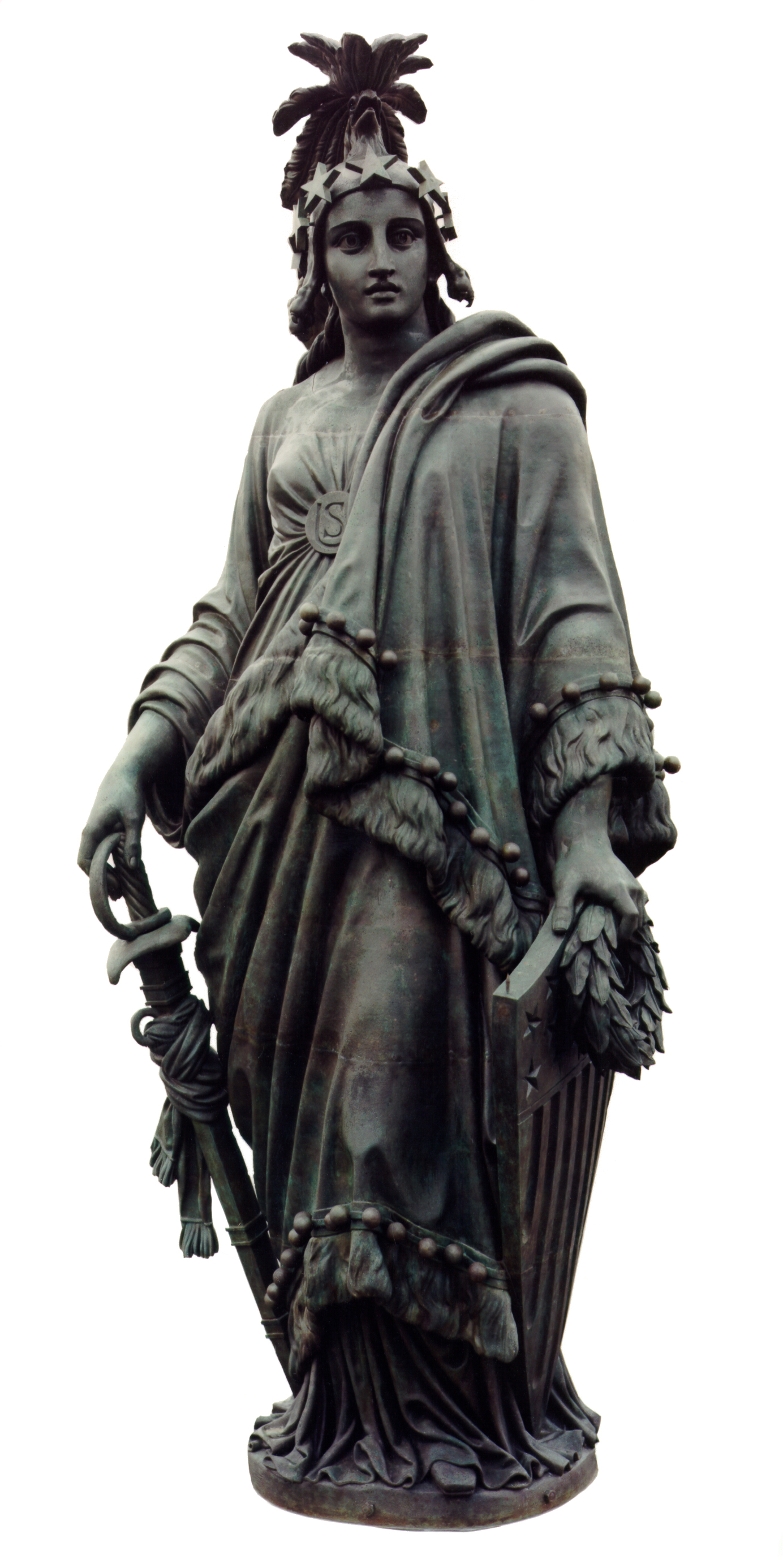
- Statue of Freedom (model, 1854–1857; cast 1860–1862)
- Artist: Thomas Crawford
- Dimensions: 5.9 m (19.5 ft)
- Weight: 15,000 pounds (6,800 kg)
- Location: United States Capitol, Washington, D.C., U.S.; 38°53′23.4″N 77°00′32.6″W

The Statue of Freedom, also known as Armed Freedom or simply Freedom, is a bronze statue designed by Thomas Crawford that, since 1863, has crowned the United States Capitol dome. Originally named Freedom Triumphant in War and Peace, a U.S. government publication now states that the statue "is officially known as the Statue of Freedom." The statue depicts a female figure bearing a military helmet and holding a sheathed sword in her right hand and a laurel wreath and shield in her left.

== Description ==
The Statue of Freedom is a colossal bronze figure standing 19 1/2 ft (5.9 m) tall and weighing approximately 15,000 pounds (6,800 kg). Her crest peaks at 288 feet (88 m) above the east front plaza of the U.S. Capitol. She is an allegorical figure whose right hand holds the hilt of a sheathed sword, while a laurel wreath of victory and the Shield of the United States are clasped in her left hand. Her chiton is secured by a brooch inscribed "U.S." and is partially covered by a heavy, American Indian–style fringed blanket thrown over her left shoulder. She faces east toward the main entrance of the building and the rising Sun. She wears a military helmet adorned with stars and an eagle's head which is itself crowned by an umbrella-like crest of feathers. Although not actually called "Columbia", she shares many of her iconic characteristics. Freedom stands atop a cast-iron globe encircled with one of the national mottoes, E pluribus unum. The lower part of the base is decorated with fasces and wreaths. Ten spikes are attached to her headdress, shoulders and shield to deter birds from roosting. The statue conducts lightning to its base, where it is grounded by thick copper wire connected to a spike in the earth as a safe, high-current pathway for lightning strikes.

== History ==
=== Design ===
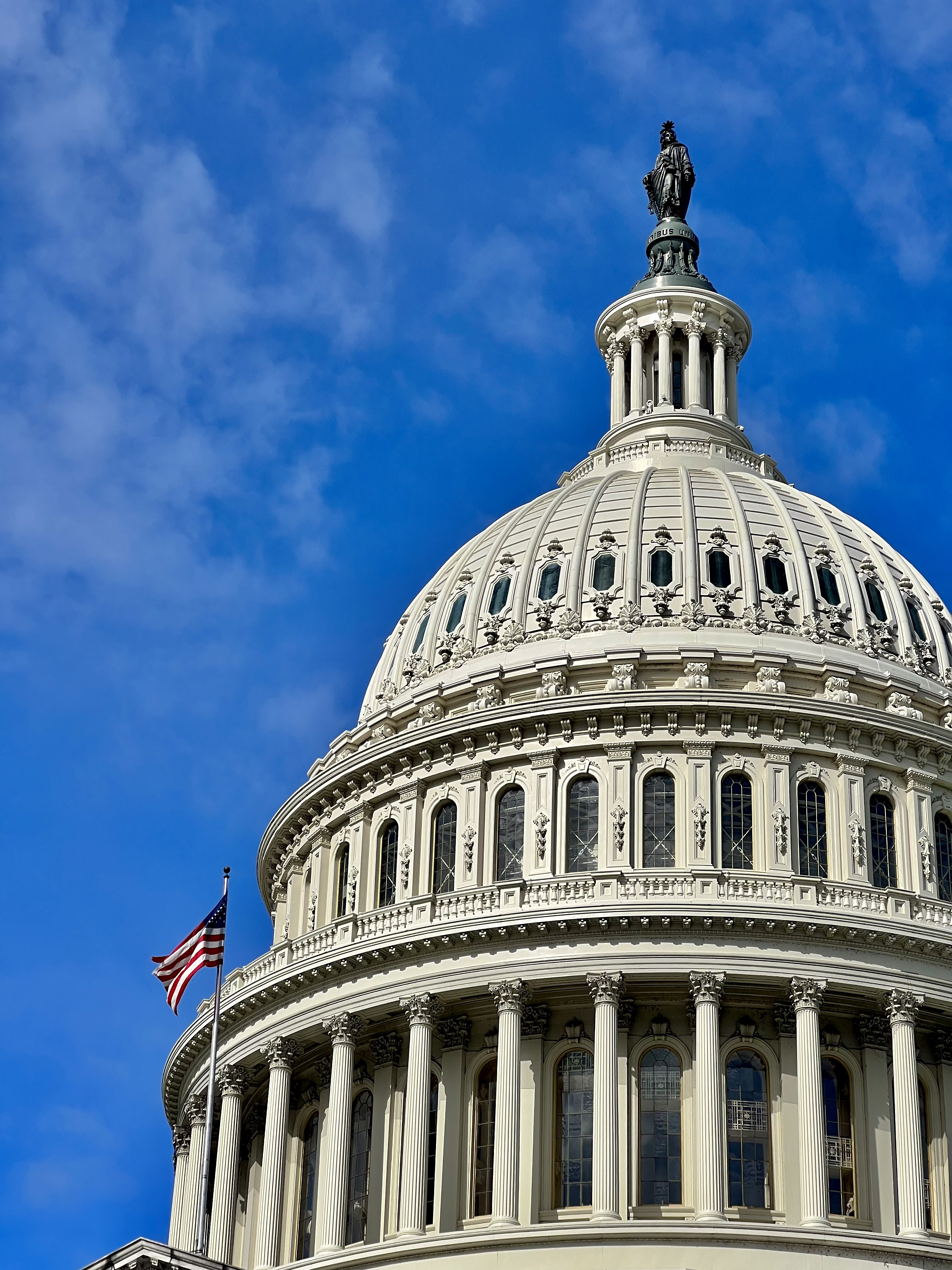
Statue on top of the Capitol Building's dome (2023)

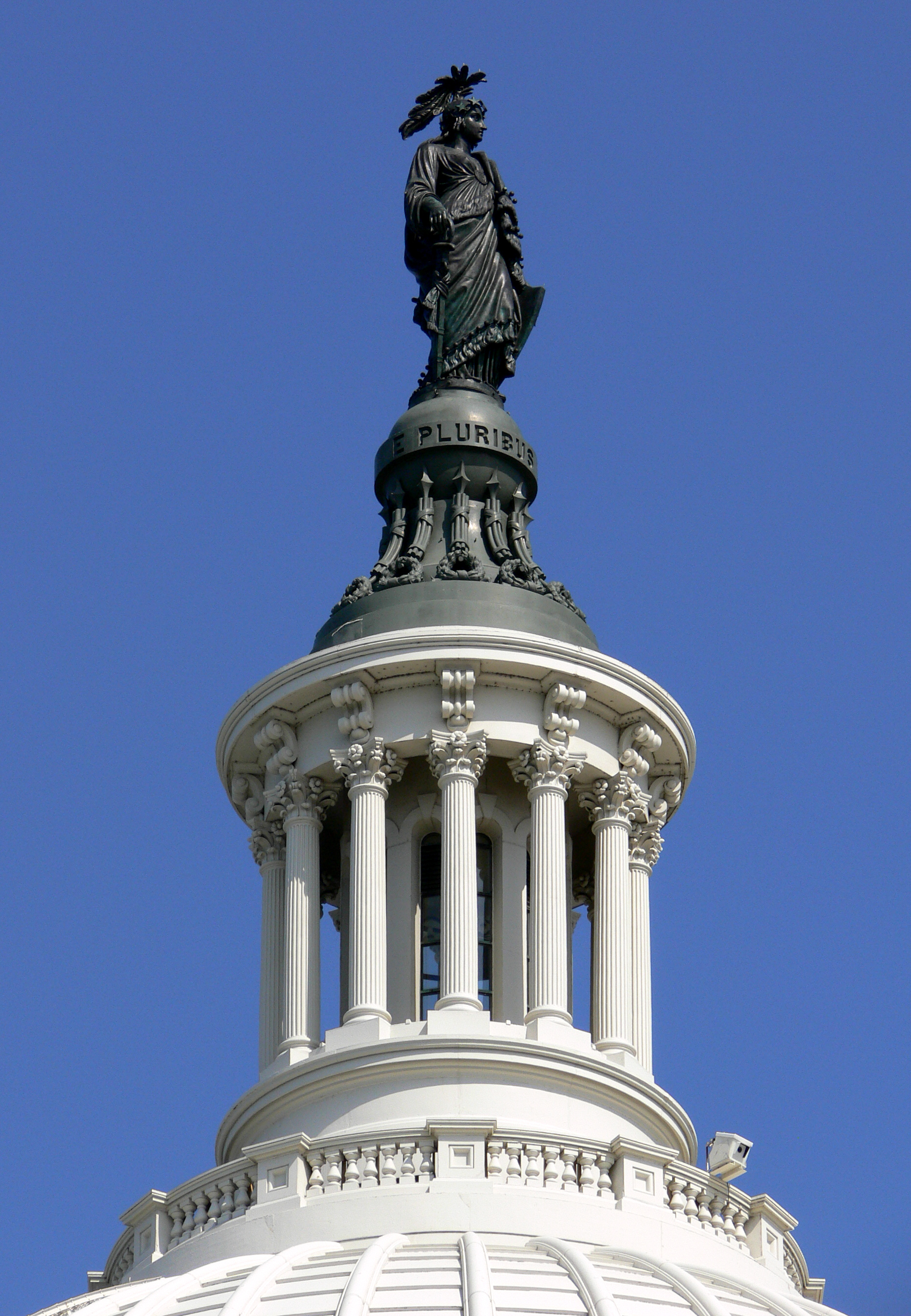
Statue of Freedom, United States Capitol Building (2007)

A monumental statue for the top of the national Capitol appeared in architect Thomas U. Walter's original drawing for the new cast-iron dome, which was authorized in 1855. Walter's drawing showed the outline of a statue representing the Goddess of Liberty; Crawford proposed instead an allegorical figure of Freedom Triumphant in War and Peace. In doing so, Crawford invoked the goddesses Minerva, Bellona, or Athena.

Crawford was commissioned to design Freedom in 1854 and executed the plaster model for the statue in his studio in Rome, Italy. U.S. Senator and U.S. Secretary of War Jefferson Davis (who would later become President of the Confederacy) was in charge of the Capitol construction and its decorations. According to David Hackett Fischer in his book Liberty and Freedom, Crawford's statue was...

...very close to Jefferson Davis's ideas in every way but one.... Above the crown he [had] added a liberty cap, the old Roman symbol of an emancipated slave. It seemed a direct affront to a militant slaveholder, and Jefferson Davis exploded with rage. The northern sculptor and the southern slaveholder had already clashed over a liberty cap in the interior decoration of the Capitol.

Davis sent his aide, Captain Montgomery Meigs, with orders to remove the cap, saying that "its history renders it inappropriate to a people who were born free and would not be enslaved". A military helmet, with an American eagle head and crest of feathers, replaced the cap in the sculpture's final version. (Today many casual observers take the statue, with its eagle and feathers, to be a Native American.)

=== Execution ===
Crawford died in 1857 before the full-size plaster model left his studio. The model, packed into six crates, was shipped from Italy in a small sailing vessel in the spring of 1858. During the voyage, the ship began to leak and stopped in Gibraltar for repairs. After leaving Gibraltar, the ship began leaking again to the point that it could go no farther than Bermuda, where the model was stored until other transportation could be arranged. Half of the crates finally arrived in New York City in December, but all sections were not in Washington, D.C., until late March 1859.

Beginning in 1860, the statue was cast in five main sections by Clark Mills, whose bronze foundry was located on the outskirts of Washington. Work was halted in 1861 because of the Civil War, but by the end of 1862, the statue was finished and temporarily displayed on the Capitol grounds. The cost of the statue, exclusive of installation, was $23,796.82.

While Freedom was being cast at Mills' foundry, the foreman in charge of the casting went on strike. Instead of paying him the higher wages he demanded, Mills turned the project over to Philip Reid, one of the slaves working at the facility. Reid presided over the rest of the casting and assembly of the figure. Late in 1863, construction of the dome was sufficiently advanced for the installation of the statue, which was hoisted by former slaves (freed by the Compensated Emancipation Act in 1862) in sections and assembled atop the cast-iron pedestal. The final section, the figure's head and shoulders, was raised on December 2, 1863, to a salute of 35 guns answered by the guns of the 12 forts around Washington, D.C.

=== Restoration ===
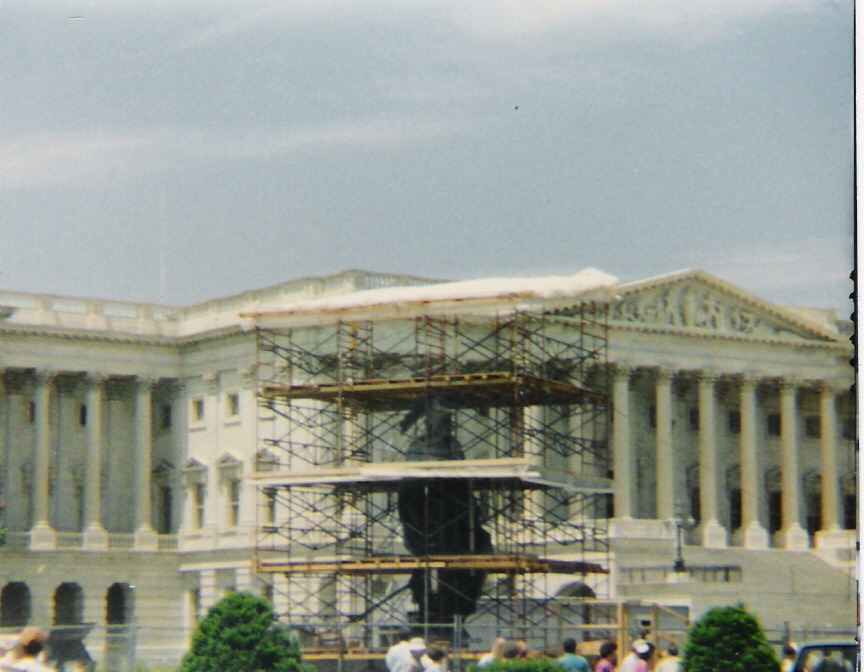
The Statue of Freedom was removed from the dome for five months in 1993.

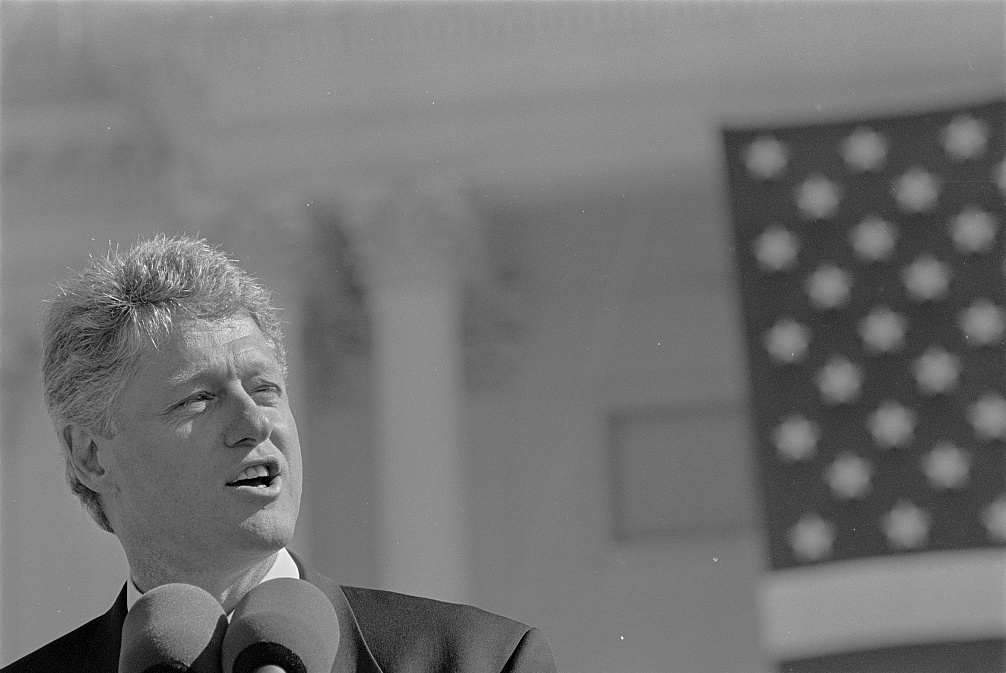
President Bill Clinton during the ceremony for the returning of the Statue of Freedom to the top of the Capitol

On May 9, 1993, after being in place almost 130 years, the statue was brought down from its pedestal by helicopter for restoration, giving tourists a rare chance to see the statue up close. The work was needed because of extensive pitting and corrosion on the surface of the bronze and because of a crack and rusting on the cast-iron pedestal. The United States Capitol Preservation Commission provided the $780,000 in privately raised funds. The work was performed by New Arts Foundry of Baltimore, Maryland.

The cast-iron pedestal was restored in place atop the dome. The metal was stripped of paint, and the wreaths and fasces were removed to ensure that they were thoroughly cleaned and coated. The crack was permanently repaired, and the entire pedestal was primed and painted with a color specially mixed to match the statue.

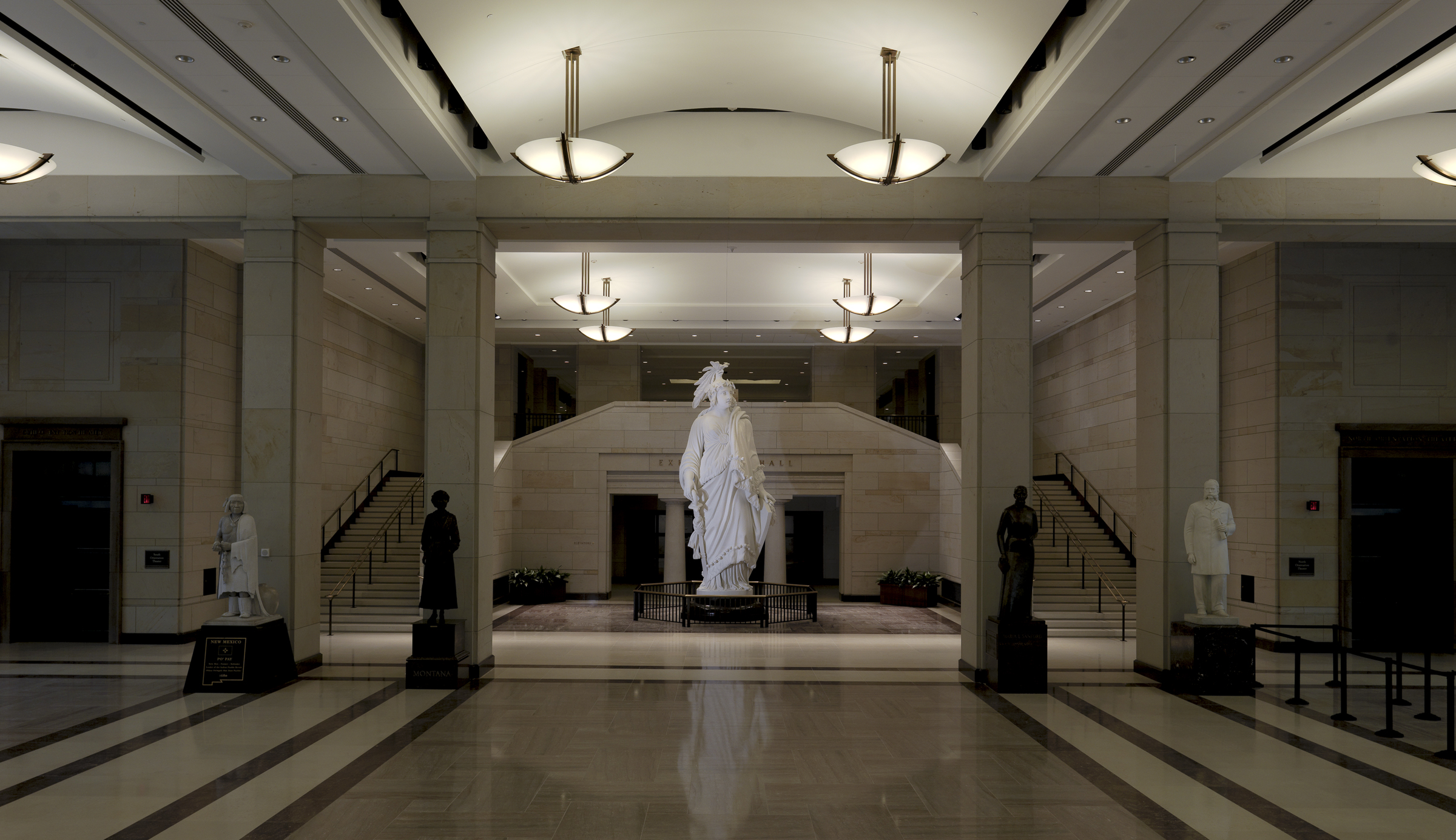
Statue of Freedom's plaster model in the Capitol Visitor Center

Restoration of the statue and the pedestal was completed in approximately four months. The Statue of Freedom was returned to its pedestal by helicopter on October 23, 1993, amid the celebration of the bicentennial of the U.S. Capitol. Since then, every 2–3 years, the statue undergoes two weeks of cleaning and recoating as necessary.

The plaster model of the statue, in storage for 25 years, was reassembled and restored in the basement rotunda of the Russell Senate Office Building, where it was returned to permanent public display in January 1993. The plaster model was relocated to the Emancipation Hall of the Capitol Visitor Center, which provides more visitors access to look at the statue's details.

== Use of Freedom's image ==
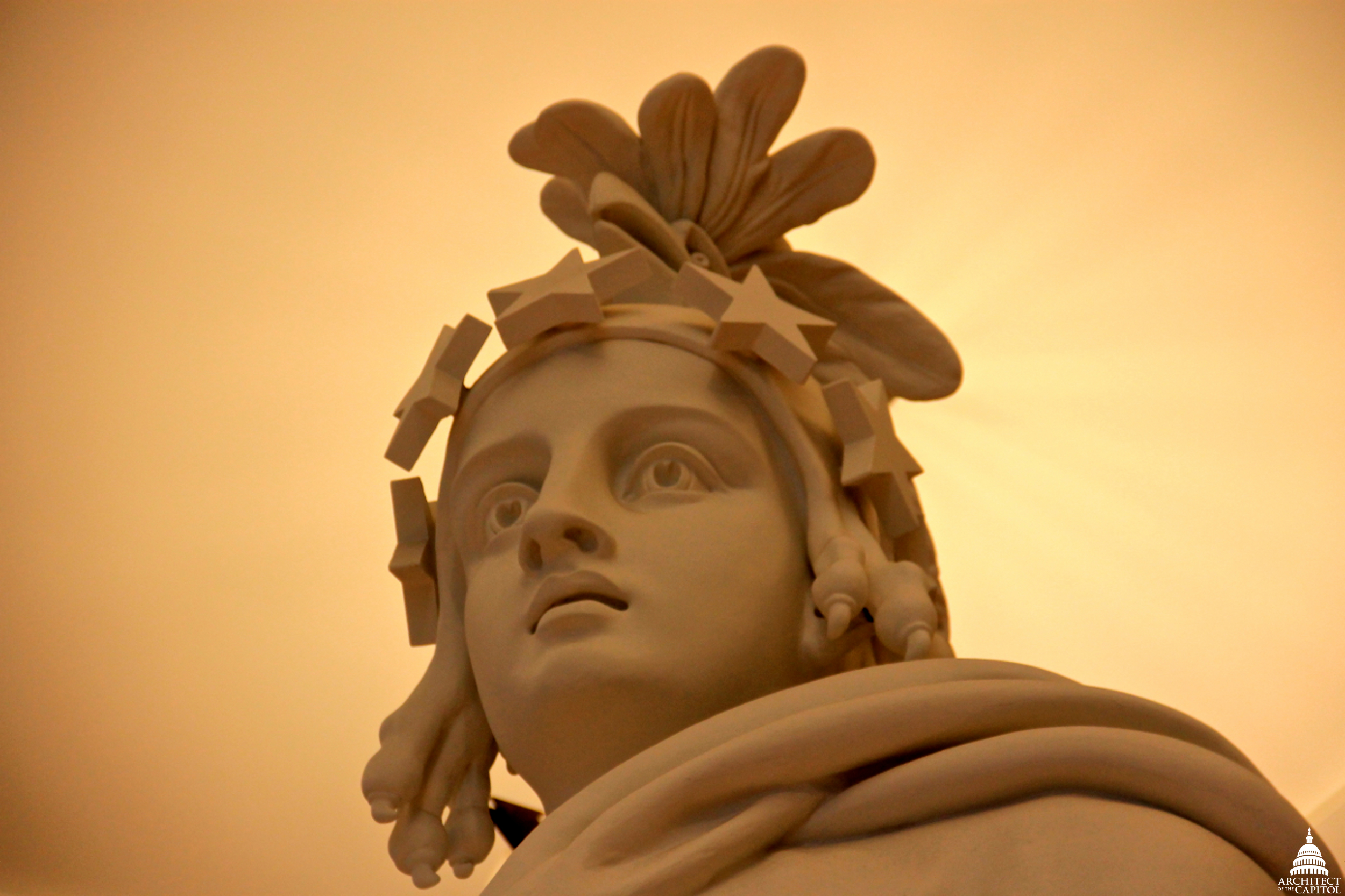
Face of the Statue of Freedom

The well-known Statue of Freedom has appeared on several official designs, akin to the Statue of Liberty. The head of the statue is depicted on a postage stamp (1923, USA Scott No. 573), which was re-issued in 2006. The entire statue is depicted on a stamp commemorating the 150th anniversary of Washington, D.C. (1950, USA Scott No. 989).

Two 1989 United States Congress Bicentennial commemorative coins feature the Statue, the half-dollar and the silver dollar.

It can also be found on the obverse of the Medal of Freedom (1945) and the reverse of the Iraq Campaign Medal, awarded to members of the U.S. military deployed to Iraq during the Iraq War. The Secretary of Defense Medal for the Global War on Terrorism also depicts the statue on the obverse of the medal.

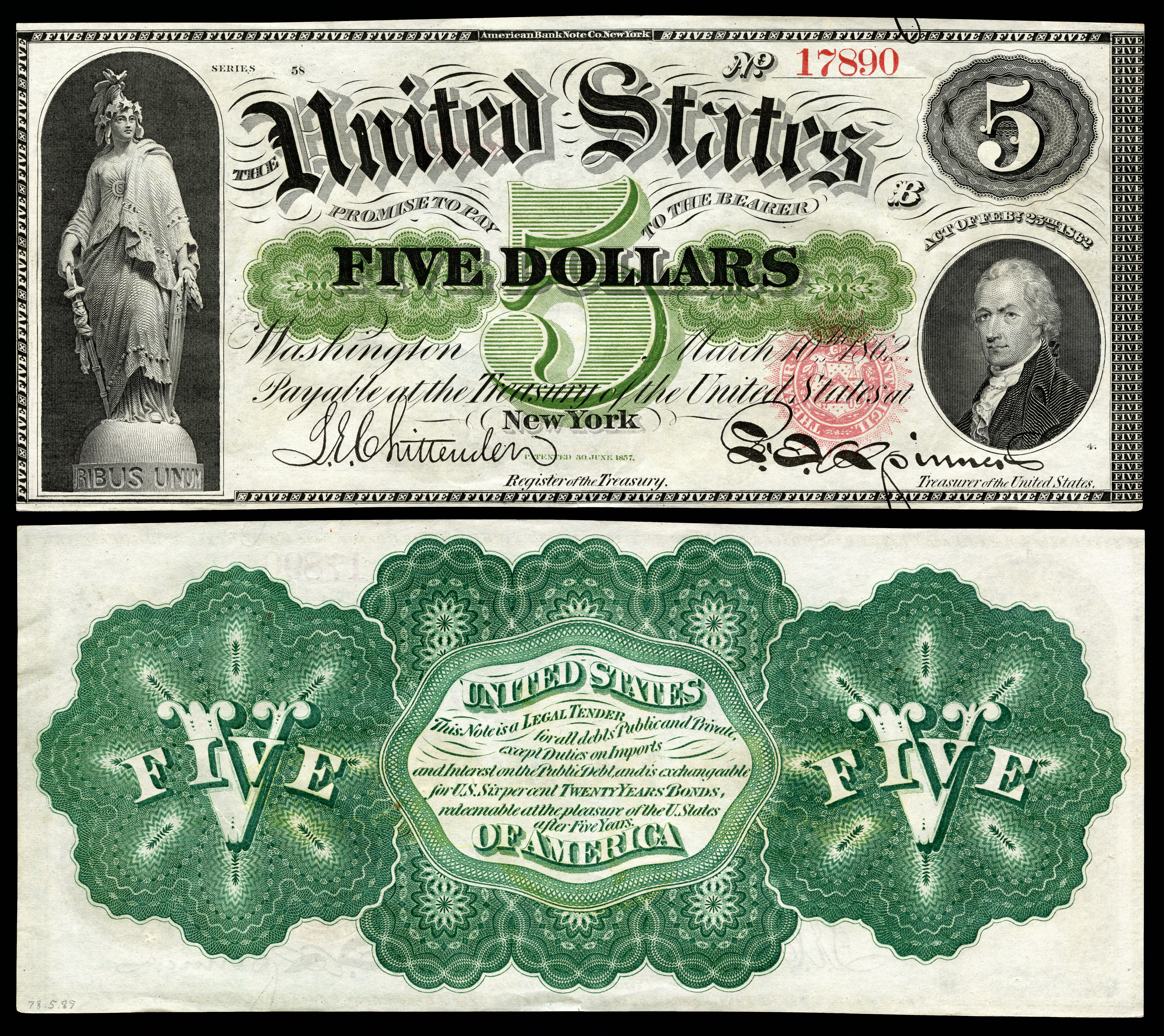
Series 1862 $5-note

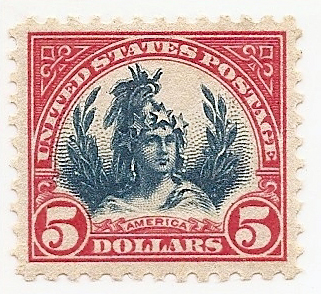
U.S. $5 postage, 1923

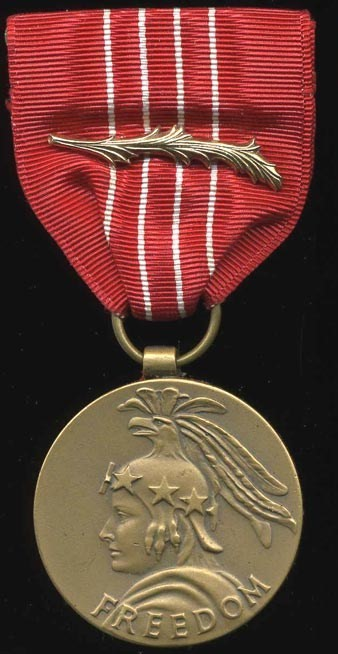
Medal of Freedom, 1945

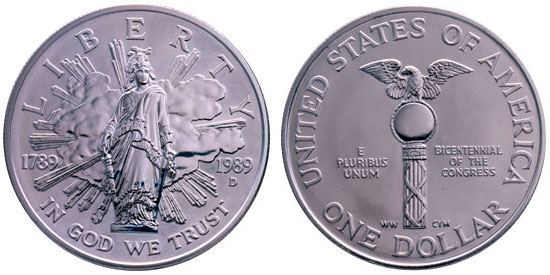
U.S. Congress Bicentennial silver dollar, 1989

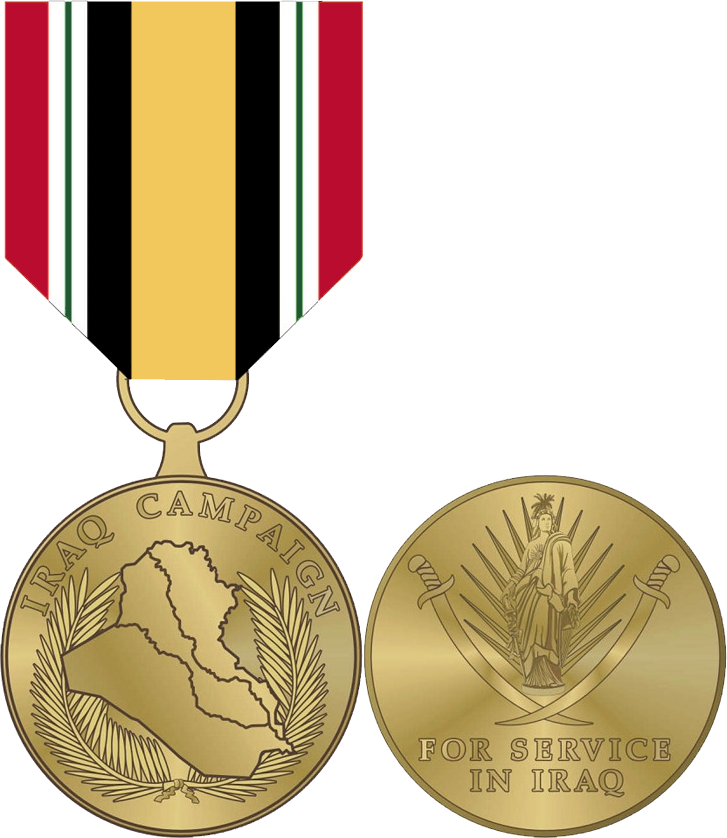
Iraq Campaign Medal, 2004

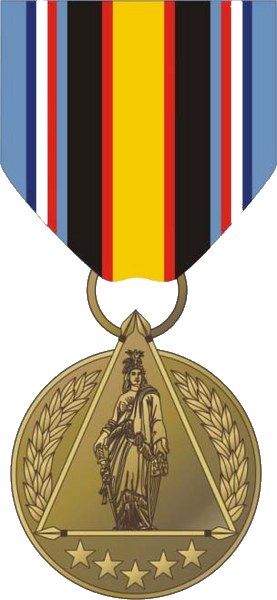
Secretary of Defense Medal for the Global War on Terrorism, 2007

== See also ==
- List of public art in Washington, D.C., Ward 6
- Statue of Liberty (Liberty Enlightening the World), 1886 statue by Frédéric Auguste Bartholdi in New York City
- Goddess of Liberty, a similar 1888 statue by Elijah E. Myers atop the Texas State Capitol dome, in Austin, Texas
- Miss Freedom, a similar 1889 statue on the dome of the Georgia State Capitol (US)
