= Mary Louise Brown =

American physician and teacher

- Born: 1861; Baltimore
- Died: March 9, 1927 (aged 65–66); Washington, D.C.
- Burial place: Woodlawn Cemetery
- Education: Howard University
- Occupations: Physician, teacher
- Known for: First African-American woman to receive a medical military commission
- Children: 0
- Parents: John Mifflin Brown (father); Mary L. (Lewis) Brown (mother)

Mary Louise Brown, MD

Mary Louise Brown (1861 – March 9, 1927) was a physician and teacher who devoted over 45 years of her life to servicing the African-American community of Washington D.C. Brown was the first African-American woman to receive a wartime medical commission when she joined the Red Cross in 1918 during World War I. Brown graduated from the Howard University College of Medicine and comingled her teaching career at Black community high schools and normal schools with a medical career, often providing medical care for free.

== Early life ==
Brown was born around 1861 in Baltimore, Maryland, and raised in a family with eight other siblings. Her father, John Mifflin Brown, was a bishop in the African Methodist Episcopal Church. As he was frequently reassigned to different churches and was involved in the establishment of various educational and social institutions in the South, the family frequently moved. The children were "talented" and were raised in the spirit of post-Civil War Reconstruction. New opportunities for African Americans arose, and along with her brothers and sisters, Mary Brown sought a professional career.

In 1879, Brown graduated from the Normal Department at Howard University in Washington D.C., which, as with every Normal School of the time, provided an opportunity to begin teaching in the city's schools. Brown started teaching English at a high school in the city's Black community.

== Medical career ==
In 1894, while teaching during the day, Brown started attending evening classes at the historically Black Howard University College of Medicine, following in the footsteps of her older brother John Mifflin Brown Jr. Her graduating class of 1898 produced 32 M.D.'s, three of which were women. In an "unprecedented" move at the time for women of color, Brown continued on to post-graduate medical education, traveling to Scotland to complete courses at the University of Edinburgh in 1899 and 1900.

Upon her return to Washington D.C., Brown settled at 1813 Vermont Avenue NW, where she would reside mainly until her death. Brown combined medical and teaching careers, teaching in the mornings and practicing medicine in the afternoons. She devoted more than 25 years of her life in service to the Black community of Washington D.C. At the time, an advanced degree earned teachers higher pay. In Brown's case, her medical degree enabled her to transition from a high school teacher of English to a science teacher at a normal school, which precipitated a significant pay increase — from $650 per year to $1000 per year, ($20,100 and $31,000 respectively in 2020 dollars. (Note: The approximate value converted to 2020 dollars, based on a standard adjustment of the 1900 dollar value using the Consumer Price Index as calculated by United States Department of Labor.))

=== Red Cross Commission ===
During World War I, in February 1918, Brown received a commission to join the Red Cross in France. She left for France on March 1, 1918 (Note: In a number of recent publications, historian Kimberly Jensen states that Brown was living in France at the time of her appointment. This is an apparent error, as contemporary newspapers reported Brown leaving Washington D.C. for France after receiving the commission.) to care for wounded soldiers. The commissions to Brown and other women were lobbied for by the American Medical Women's Association (AMWA) and National American Woman Suffrage Association (NAWSA). Brown's appointment was noted in media across the country as the first military medical commission awarded to a Black woman. In 1918, the Red Cross and the US Army commissioned approximately 80 women, only two of which, including Brown, were women of color. At the time, women's organizations advocated for such personnel to receive military service records (as was customary for military doctors of other countries involved in World War I). However, this effort was unsuccessful, and in most cases, including Brown's, no such records were received.

== Social services and activism ==
Brown played an active role in the Black community of Washington D.C., often volunteering her medical services. She was in contact with leading women's organizations of the day, including AMWA and NAWSA, which lobbied for Brown's wartime commission in 1918. She was also in touch with Katherine D. Tillman of the National Association of Colored Women and later with the National Association for the Advancement of Colored People.

== Death ==
Brown died in her home at 1813 Vermont Avenue NW on March 9, 1927. Her death was described as "sudden." She was buried at Woodlawn Cemetery on March 12, 1927.

== See also ==
- John Mifflin Brown
- Katherine D. Tillman
- Howard University
- Normal School for Colored Girls

== Literature cited ==
- "CPI Inflation Calculator", Bureau of Labor Statistics, Washington: United States Department of Labor
- "Howard University", Evening Times, no. 860, Washington: Washington Times Company, p. 6, May 3, 1898, ISSN 1941-0689, LCCN sn84024441, OCLC 10954477
- Noyes, Crosby Stuart, ed. (May 7, 1898), "Receive diplomas", Evening Star, no. 14098, Washington: W. D. Wallach, p. 25, ISSN 2331-9968, LCCN sn83045462, OCLC 2260929
- Noyes, Crosby Stuart, ed. (November 28, 1907), "Colored Social Settlement", Evening Star, no. 17231, Washington: W. D. Wallach, p. 2, ISSN 2331-9968, LCCN sn83045462, OCLC 2260929
- "News from the Capital city", New York Age, New York: Fortune & Peterson, p. 3, July 28, 1910, LCCN sn83030005, OCLC 9274417
- "Colored female physician goes to France", Alton Evening Telegraph, Alton: Telegraph Printing Company, p. 5, February 15, 1918, OCLC 24655855
- Muse, Chas. S., ed. (March 9, 1918), "Eminent doctor goes to France", Denver Star, vol. 29, no. 29, Denver: Chas. S. Muse, p. 5, ISSN 2577-2376, LCCN sn84025887, OCLC 10571156
- Du Bois, William Edward Burghardt, ed. (May 1, 1918), "Personal", Crisis, vol. 16, no. 1, New York: National Association for the Advancement of Colored People, pp. 34–36, ISSN 0011-1422, LCCN sc83009469, OCLC 6869465
- Morgan, William Yoast, ed. (May 30, 1918), "Graduate to go to France", Hutchinson News, Hutchinson: Hutchinson News Company, p. 5, LCCN sn85030698, OCLC 12257661
- Stevens, Cyrus Lee, ed. (August 1, 1918), "General news items", Pennsylvania Medical Journal, vol. XXI, no. II, Harrisburg: Medical Society of the State of Pennsylvania, pp. 713–715, ISSN 0892-8266, LCCN 07041920, OCLC 6371053
- Noyes, Theodore Williams, ed. (March 10, 1927), "Deaths", Evening Star, no. 30263, Washington: W. D. Wallach, p. 9, ISSN 2331-9968, LCCN sn83045462, OCLC 2260929
- Noyes, Theodore Williams, ed. (March 11, 1927), "Deaths", Evening Star, no. 30264, Washington: W. D. Wallach, p. 9, ISSN 2331-9968, LCCN sn83045462, OCLC 2260929
- Jensen, Kimberly (December 1, 1993), "Uncle Sam's Loyal Nieces: American Medical Women, Citizenship, and War Service in World War I", Bulletin of the History of Medicine, 67 (4), Baltimore: Johns Hopkins University Press: 670–690, ISSN 0007-5140, JSTOR 44445837, LCCN 34033593, OCLC 1537779, PMID 8312707
- Jensen, Kimberly (2008), Mobilizing Minerva: American women in the First World War, Urbana: University of Illinois Press, ISBN 978-0252032370, LCCN 2007020857, OCLC 134991191
- Jensen, Kimberly (2012), "Volunteers, Auxiliaries, and Women's Mobilization: The First World War and Beyond (1914–1939)", in Hacker, Barton C.; Vining, Margaret (eds.), Companion to Women's Military History, History of warfare, vol. 74, Leiden: Brill, pp. 189–231, ISBN 978-9004212176, ISSN 1385-7827, LCCN 2012015726, OCLC 1090183987
- Lamb, Daniel Smith (1900), A historical, biographical and statistical souvenir, Black biographical dictionaries, 1790-1950, vol. 151, Washington: R. Beresford, LCCN 38024761, OCLC 69245430
- Lemay, Kate Clarke (August 16, 2020), "The untold story of women who risked their lives to do good - and get their rights", CNN, New York: WarnerMedia, OCLC 321387923, archived from the original on February 8, 2021
- Moldow, Gloria (1987), Women doctors in gilded-age Washington: race, gender, and professionalization, Women in American history, Urbana: University of Illinois Press, ISBN 0252013794, LCCN 86019251, OCLC 86019251
- Moldow, Gloria (1993), "Brown, Mary Louise (b.1868)", in Hine, Darlene Clark; Brown, Elsa Barkley; Terborg-Penn, Rosalyn (eds.), Black women in America: an historical encyclopedia, vol. 1, Brooklyn: Carlson, p. 182, ISBN 0926019619, LCCN 92039947, OCLC 531830092
- Moldow, Gloria (1997), "Brown, Mary Louise (1868-?)", in Hine, Darlene Clark; Thompson, Kathleen (eds.), Facts On File Encyclopedia of Black Women in America: Science, Health, and Medicine, vol. 11, New York: Facts on File, p. 45, ISBN 0816034281, LCCN 96033268, OCLC 934936907
- Patil, Rushikesh (August 16, 2020), "The untold story of ladies who risked their lives to do good — and get their rights (opinion)", dailygovjob.com, Newspaper Magazine Pro
- Schneider, Dorothy; Schneider, Carl J. (1991), Into the Breach: American women overseas in World War I, New York: Viking, ISBN 0670839361, LCCN 90050751, OCLC 22707733
