= The Bellamy Trial =

1929 film

- Theatrical release poster
- Directed by: Monta Bell
- Screenplay by: Monta Bell; Joseph Farnham
- Based on: The Bellamy Trial by Frances Noyes Hart
- Starring: Leatrice Joy; Betty Bronson; Edward J. Nugent; George Barraud; Margaret Livingston
- Cinematography: Arthur C. Miller
- Edited by: Frank Sullivan
- Music by: William Axt; Paul Marquardt
- Production company: Metro-Goldwyn-Mayer
- Distributed by: Metro-Goldwyn-Mayer
- Release date: January 23, 1929
- Running time: 95 minutes
- Country: United States
- Languages: Sound (Part-Talkie); English Intertitles

The Bellamy Trial is a 1929 sound part-talkie American drama film directed by Monta Bell and written by Monta Bell and Joseph Farnham. In addition to sequences with audible dialogue or talking sequences, the film features a synchronized musical score and sound effects along with English intertitles. The film stars Leatrice Joy, Betty Bronson, Edward J. Nugent, George Barraud, and Margaret Livingston. The film was released on January 23, 1929, by Metro-Goldwyn-Mayer. It was adapted from the 1927 novel The Bellamy Trial by Frances Noyes Hart, itself inspired by the Hall–Mills murder case.

== Plot ==
For the murder of his wife, a husband along with a suspected female accomplice are put on trial. After a barrage of questions from the cross-examing district attorney, a surprise witness comes forth with testimony that may clear the two accused.

== Cast ==
- Leatrice Joy as Sue Ives
- Betty Bronson as Reporter
- Edward J. Nugent as Reporter
- George Barraud as Pat Ives
- Margaret Livingston as Mimi Bellamy
- Kenneth Thomson as Stephen Bellamy
- Margaret Seddon as Mother Ives
- Charles Middleton as District Attorney
- Charles Hill Mailes as Defense Attorney
- William H. Tooker as Judge Carver
- Cosmo Kyrle Bellew
- Robert Dudley as Coroner
- Jacqueline Gadsdon (credited as Jacqueline Gadsden)
- Dan Mason
- Jack Raymond
- Polly Ann Young

== Preservation status ==
- This film is incomplete with only reels 7 and 8 surviving.

== See also ==
- List of early sound feature films (1926–1929)
