= Crosby S. Noyes =

American journalist

Crosby S. Noyes (March 2, 1921 - April 7, 1988) was an American newspaperman. He was a great-grandson of Crosby Stuart Noyes, a co-owner of the Washington Evening Star from 1867 to 1908 who was its long-time editor-in-chief. The younger Crosby Noyes was a son of Newbold Noyes Sr., a Star associate editor. His older brother, Newbold Noyes Jr., was the Star's editor from 1963 to 1975, when the paper was sold to Joe L. Allbritton, a banker. In 1978 Allbritton in turn sold the paper to Time, Inc., which closed it in 1981.

Noyes began his career on the Star in 1947 after World War II service as a fighter pilot in Europe and graduation from Yale. He specialized in foreign affairs, first as chief European correspondent, then as foreign editor. He retired in 1974.

The Noyes family co-owned The Star from 1867 to 1975.
