= William Derrick =

William Derrick may refer to:

- William B. Derrick (1843–1913), African Methodist Episcopal bishop and missionary
- William S. Derrick (1802–1852), American politician from Pennsylvania
