= Jesse Lawson =

American social activist and educator (1856–1927)

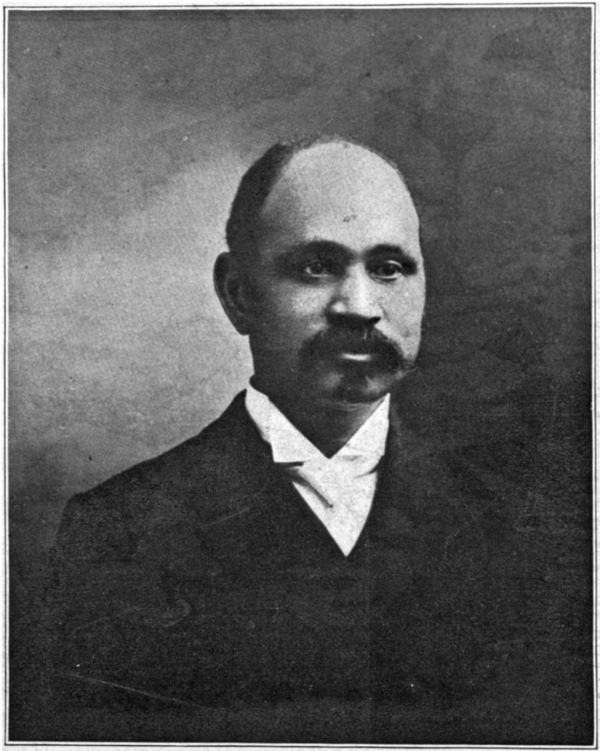
- Lawson at the Washington Conference on the Race Problem in the United States in 1903
- Born: May 18, 1856; Nanjemoy, Maryland, U.S.
- Died: November 8, 1927 (aged 71); Washington, D.C., U.S.
- Education: Howard University (BA, LLB, MA)
- Occupations: Educator; journalist; lawyer
- Known for: Political activism, co-founding Frelinghuysen University
- Political party: Republican
- Spouse: Rosetta Lawson (m. 1884)
- Children: Four

Jesse Lawson (May 18, 1856 – November 8, 1927) was an American lawyer, educator, and activist. He served as an officer of the Afro-American Council, where he promoted racial justice and anti-Jim Crow legislation to the public and before Congress. He was the founder of the National Sociological Society and co-founded Frelinghuysen University with his wife, educator and activist Rosetta Lawson. Lawson received a Master of Arts from Howard University School of Law and served as a legal examiner for the Bureau of Pensions for 44 years. A Republican, he served as legal counsel for John Mercer Langston before the United States House of Representatives, successfully challenging the results of the 1888 elections in Virginia. He was also the editor of The Colored American and authored several works on political topics.

== Family and education ==
Jesse Lawson was born in Nanjemoy, Maryland, on May 18, 1856, to Jesse and Charlotte Lawson. At an early age, after his parents' deaths, he moved to Plainfield, New Jersey, with Commodore W. M. McGough, who took over his education. Lawson attended Howard University, where he graduated with a Bachelor of Arts in 1881 and delivered the first oration at the graduation ceremony. Lawson went on to attend Howard University School of Law, earning a Bachelor of Laws in 1884 and a Master of Arts the following year. Later, from 1901 to 1905, he attended special lectures on social issues as a member of the American Academy of Political and Social Science at the University of Pennsylvania. Lawson married educator and activist Rosetta Lawson (née Coakley) in Washington, D.C., in 1884, and remained so until his death in 1927. Together they had a daughter and three sons.

== Career ==
In 1882, after earning his B.A. from Howard University, Lawson began working as a legal examiner at the Bureau of Pensions, a position he held for 44 years until his retirement in May 1926. During this time, he worked as the editor of The Colored American, an African-American newspaper in Washington, D.C., from 1895 until 1897. Later, in 1889, he served as legal counsel for John Mercer Langston before the United States House of Representatives after Langston contested his loss in the 1888 elections. The challenge was eventually successful, and Langston assumed the House seat on September 30, 1890.

Lawson's academic career began in the Lyceum of the Second Baptist Church in Washington, D.C., where he lectured in sociology. He became president and professor of sociology and ethics at the Bible College and Institute for Civic and Social Betterment in 1906. He also gave lectures on sociology at other institutions in Washington, D.C. Lawson and his wife organized a branch of the Bible Educational Association in 1906, with Kelly Miller elected as its president. Lawson was later instrumental in founding the Inter-Denominational Bible College, where he was named president. In 1917, the Bible Educational Association and the Inter-Denominational Bible College merged, forming Frelinghuysen University, with Lawson as its head. The university was focused on working Black adults, allowing them to further their education when unable to meet the requirements of traditional schooling. The university charged minimal tuition, and classes were often taught out of homes in the area; the first classes were taught in Lawson's home. Lawson remained president of the university for 21 years.

== Political activism ==
A member of the Republican Party, Lawson was a delegate to the 1884 Republican National Convention. He was an officer of the Afro-American Council (AAC), as well as a representative of its legal bureau. In this capacity, he worked with Daniel Alexander Payne Murray in defining a strategy of drawing attention to the social, political, and economic issues African Americans faced, intending to get Congress to consider the effects of disenfranchisement on African Americans. In 1902, the House Committee on Labor drafted a bill to create the Freedmen's Inquiry Commission, tasked with comprehensively investigating the condition of African Americans in the United States and finding the "best means of promoting harmony between the races". The bill was sponsored by Republican congressman Harvey S. Irwin, with Lawson and Murray testifying before Congress in support of it, though it ultimately never passed into law. As a member of the AAC, Lawson went on to support other racial justice and anti-Jim Crow legislation and tried to focus the attention of Congress on disenfranchisement. He authored several works on political causes, including How to Solve the Race Problem, The Ethics of the Labor Problem, and The Vacant Chair in Our Educational System.

== Community activism ==
In 1895, Lawson was the president of the board of commissioners of the District of Columbia for the Cotton States and International Exposition, overseeing the creation of exhibits to demonstrate the skill and advancement of African Americans since emancipation. He served as the vice president of the National Emancipation Commemorative Society. Created in 1909, the society organized celebrations in honor of the issuance of the Emancipation Proclamation. He was also an active supporter of the temperance movement, giving public talks on the importance of enfranchisement, education, and the moral and social development of the African American community.

== National Sociological Society ==
In the early 1900s, Lawson founded the National Sociological Society, serving as its vice president. The society was established with the goal of considering "the race problem" and gathering information on race relations to present to the public and Congress. Its membership was open to "any person of good character" and charged a fee or assessment of dues. A partial membership list names at least 164 members, both African American and white, and from northern and southern states. The society convened a single conference in 1903 in response to Booker T. Washington's call for a national conference on race relations. The conference, which brought together African Americans and whites, resulted in substantive discourse on race relations. In 1904 Lawson edited and published a volume, How to Solve the Race Problem: The Proceedings of the Washington Conference on the Race Problem in the United States under the Auspices of the National Sociological Society, documenting the event. Of the proceedings, Lawson wrote that there was wide agreement on the basic points: "[a]‌s solutions of the race problem we regard colonization, expatriation, and segregation as unworthy of future consideration", and "[we] have abiding faith in the principles of human rights established in the Declaration of Independence and the national Constitution". Beyond those points, there was little consensus, with law professor Susan Carle describing the opinions discussed at the conference as "inchoate and disparate, pointing to the still substantially unsettled status of strategic choices for a racial justice campaign for the [20th century]".

== Death ==
Lawson died at 71 years of age on November 8, 1927, at Freedmen's Hospital, and was buried at Woodlawn Cemetery in Washington, D.C. Michael R. Hill wrote in Diverse Histories of American Sociology that he and his wife "dedicated their lives to race betterment".
