= Rosetta Lawson =

American social activist and educator (c. 1857–1936)

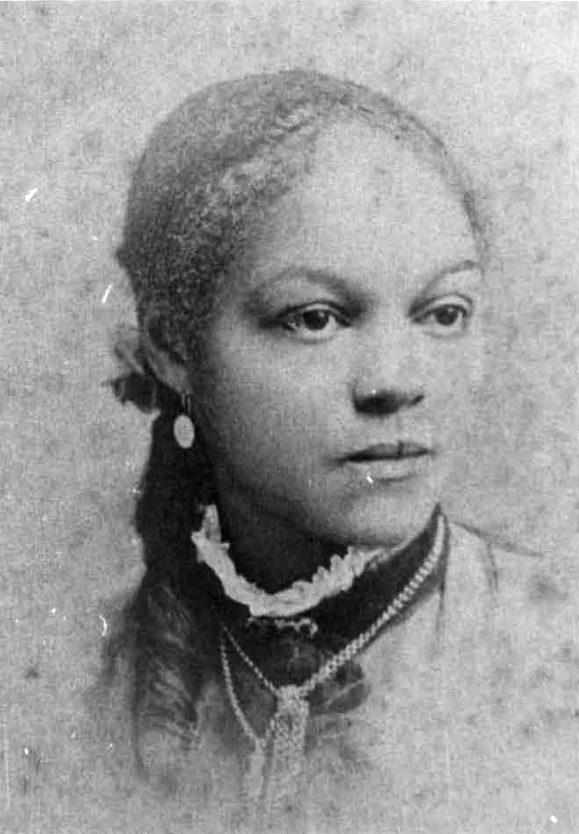
- Lawson in The Woman's Era, 1896
- Born: Rosetta Evelyn Coakley c. 1857; King George County, Virginia, U.S.
- Died: April 19, 1936 (aged 78-79); Washington, D.C., U.S.
- Resting place: Woodlawn Cemetery; Washington, D.C., U.S.
- Education: Chautauqua Institution, 1884
- Occupation: Educator
- Known for: Social activism, co-founding Frelinghuysen University
- Spouse: Jesse Lawson (m. 1884; died 1927)
- Children: 4

Rosetta Evelyn Lawson (née Coakley, born c. 1857, died April 19, 1936) was an American temperance activist, educator, and suffragette. She was, with her husband, educator and activist Jesse Lawson, a co-founder of Frelinghuysen University, where she taught anatomy and physiology. She served for 30 years as a national organizer for the Woman's Christian Temperance Union. Lawson organized the first Congress of Colored Women in the United States, and was elected to the executive committee of the National Association of Colored Women's Clubs.

== Family and education ==
Lawson was born c. 1857 in King George County, Virginia, to a free Black mother and an enslaved father. By her second year, her father had fled to freedom, and in 1862, when she was five, her mother brought her to Washington, D.C., where slavery was already abolished. She attended public schools, and in her third year of high school she became the assistant to the principal of her former grammar school. In 1873 she began working for the office of the superintendent, and continued working in the Washington, D.C., public school system until 1885.

While working for the Washington, D.C., public schools, she continued her studies and became interested in the Chautauqua movement, a social movement promoting adult education and morally sound entertainment. In 1880 she began coursework, and in 1884 she graduated from the Chautauqua Institution, receiving her diploma from John H. Vincent for completing the Chautauqua literary and scientific circuit. Lawson went on to earn a degree in chiropractic science from Frelinghuysen University.

She married Jesse Lawson, a lawyer, educator, and activist, in 1884. He was born May 8, 1856, in Nanjemoy, Maryland, and attended Howard University. Together, they had a daughter and three sons. Jesse died on November 8, 1927.

== Advocacy ==
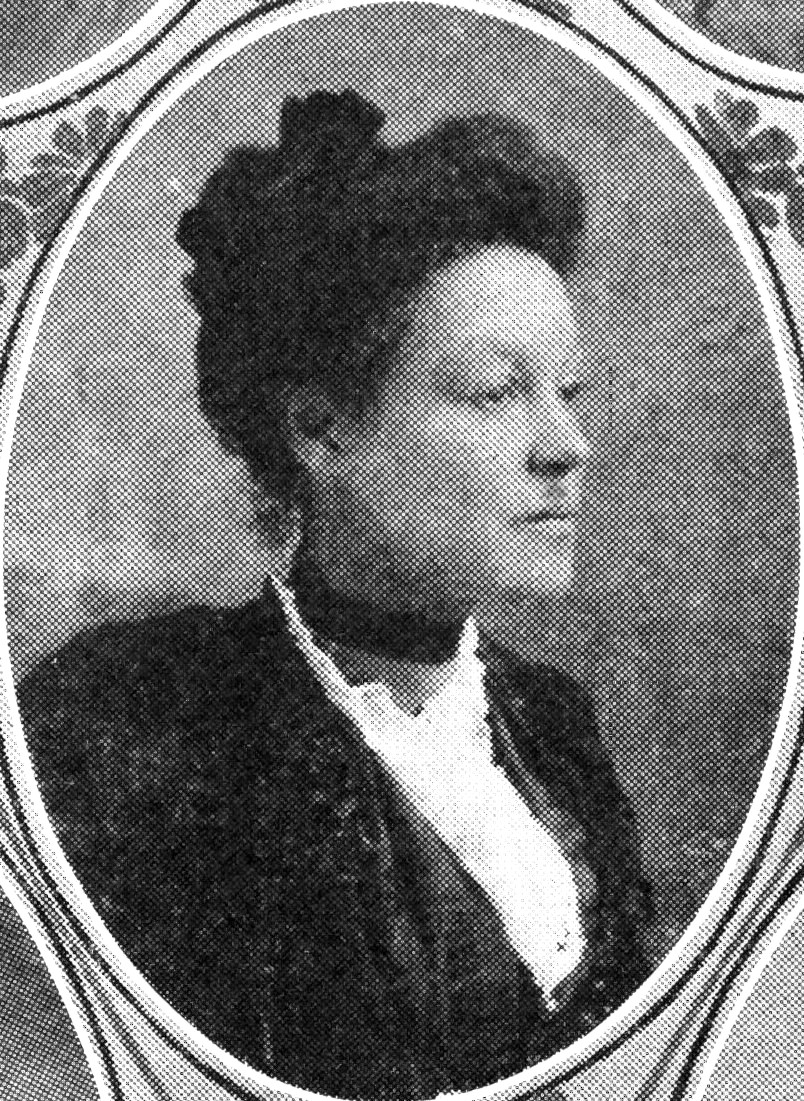
Lawson in 1906

Lawson was very active in social activism and civil rights, taking an active role in organizations working for the betterment of the African American community. In 1895, she organized the first Congress of Colored Women in the United States, and in 1896, when the women's clubs the National Federation of Afro-American Women and the National League of Colored Women combined to form the National Association of Colored Women's Clubs (NACWC), she was elected to the executive committee. The civic organization was created with the initial purpose "to furnish evidence of the moral, mental and material progress made by people of color through the efforts of our women," in response to a letter written by the president of the Missouri Press Association that challenged the respectability of African American women. As of 2022, the NACWC is still active, and works for the betterment of the African American community and to promote racial harmony.

Later, in 1905, Lawson established a Young Women's Christian Association (YWCA) in Washington, D.C. It was the first YWCA established in the city and is the only Black independent YWCA in the United States. Lawson gave speeches as an opponent of racial segregation, and took part in founding the Alley Improvement Association, which worked to provide better housing for the poor of Washington, D.C. She also worked with Bands of Mercy, an organization dedicated to fighting animal cruelty and teaching people, especially children, to be kind to animals.

Lawson was a staunch advocate of temperance, frequently giving talks against the consumption of alcohol. She served the Women's Christian Temperance Union (WCTU) for 30 years as a national organizer, traveling internationally to speak at conferences about the WCTU and the dangers of alcohol. While travelling and speaking about temperance she was praised as "the best colored woman orator in the country" in The Morning News of Wilmington, Delaware. In 1910, the Plainfield, New Jersey, chapter of the WCTU changed their name to the "Rosetta Lawson Union" in her honor.

Lawson and her husband organized a branch of the Bible Educational Association in 1906, with Kelly Miller elected as its president. Lawson was later instrumental in the founding of the Inter-Denominational Bible College, with her husband, Jesse Lawson, as its president. In 1917, the Bible Educational Association and the Inter-Denominational Bible College merged, forming Frelinghuysen University, with Jesse Lawson as its head. The university was focused towards working Black adults, allowing them to further their education when unable to meet the requirements of traditional schooling. The university charged minimal tuition and classes were often taught out of homes in the area. The first classes were taught in Lawson's home. She would go on to teach anatomy and physiology at the University.

She was a Christian, and was the member or founder of several Christian affiliated organizations. She was active in her church, and taught Sunday school classes there. She would speak at churches and with clergy to promote the cause of temperance and uplifting African Americans.

== Death and legacy ==
She died of chronic nephritis on April 19, 1936, and was buried in Woodlawn Cemetery. Michael R. Hill wrote in Diverse Histories of American Sociology that she "became a major force in her own right," and she and her husband "dedicated their lives to race betterment."
