= Dick Francis (bartender) =

Richard Francis (c. 1827 – November 30, 1888) was an African-American bartender in Washington, D.C. He is believed to have been the second African-American bar manager for the United States Congress. His son, John R. Francis, was a Washington physician and educator.

== Life and career ==
Francis was born in about 1827 to free African-American parents in Surry County, Virginia. By 1848 he was in Washington, D.C., where he worked at Hancock's bar on 12th and Pennsylvania Avenue Northwest for almost four decades. He began working as a porter (a combination barback and janitor), but soon became a bartender. He was a friend and confidant to a wide range of Washington politicians, reportedly including antebellum senators Henry Clay, John C. Calhoun, and Daniel Webster, causing the Nashville American to note that "One thing is certain, no other man in this country has faced more great men than Dick."

In 1884, his friend, Senator George F. Edmunds, who was at that time President pro tempore of the Senate, gave him the patronage role of managing the private restaurant and bar that then existed in the U.S. Senate. Cocktail historian Dave Wondrich reports that, while the record is fragmentary, the first Black bartender for Congress was an individual by the name of Carter in the 1830s to 1850s, and Francis is believed therefore to be the second Black bar manager for Congress.

Francis died in 1888 a wealthy man due to his investments in DC real estate; his son, Dr. John R. Francis, later purchased Hancock's bar.

He died of a paralytic stroke at home the morning of November 30, 1888 at the age of 62.
