= John R. Francis =

American physician and educator (1856–1913)

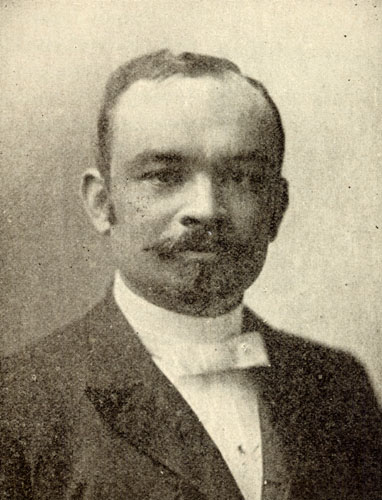
- Born: March 3, 1856; Washington, D.C. U.S.
- Died: May 23, 1913 (aged 57); Washington, D.C.
- Education: University of Michigan (MD)
- Occupations: Physician, educator
- Employer: Howard University

John Richard Francis (March 3, 1856 – May 23, 1913) was an American physician and educator from Washington, D.C. A graduate of the University of Michigan, Francis established a private sanatorium, taught and practiced obstetrics at Howard University and its hospital, and served on the District of Columbia school board. Booker T. Washington described Francis as "one of the best known physicians" in D.C.

== Early life and education ==
Francis was born in Georgetown, Washington, D.C., on March 3, 1856. His father, Richard "Dick" Francis, was an African American caterer and bartender at the well-known Hancock's Restaurant near the U.S. Capitol (John R. purchased Hancock's in 1885). His mother was Mary E. Francis, a homemaker.

Francis attended preparatory school at Howard University from 1868 to 1872 before graduating from the Wesleyan Academy in Wilbraham, Massachusetts. He began his medical education under the tutelage of Christopher Christian Cox and studied medicine at Howard University from 1875 to 1877. He graduated magna cum laude with his doctorate of medicine from the University of Michigan in 1878.

== Medical career ==
Less than twenty years after graduation, Francis had become "the leading Colored physician of Washington, D.C." In April 1894, he was appointed first assistant surgeon at the Freedman's Hospital. As the hospital's interim chief surgeon from April 16, 1894 to June 30, 1895, he reformed patient care, established a training program for nurses, and advocated for more government funding. He became the hospital's obstetrician and served as demonstrator and clinical lecturer in obstetrics in Howard University's medical department.

In November 1894, Francis founded a private sanatorium on Pennsylvania Avenue. While the Francis Sanatorium catered to physically sick or convalescent patients from the city's Black middle class, the clinical staff also treated poor African Americans. A contemporary lauded the sanitarium as "being the only place of its kind in the United States, established, owned and managed by a colored man."

Ideologically, Francis aligned with Booker T. Washington, calling for Black progress through self-education and entrepreneurship. Francis was highly active in the District of Columbia's civic affairs. Both Francis and his wife served on the D.C. Board of Education, though he resigned in disappointment at lacking support to improve the education Black students. Francis had joined the board in 1887. In 1906, he joined the District of Columbia Board of Health. He served as pallbearer at Frederick Douglass's funeral in 1906, represented D.C. at the National Conference of Charities and Collections in 1909, served on the committee for construction of the Carnegie Library at Howard University in 1909, became a member of the National Medical Association in 1910, and joined the Howard University board of trustees in 1912. He belonged to the Civic Club, the Washington Automobile Club, and other associations.

== Personal life ==
Francis married Bettie Francis in 1881 and had five children, two of whom became physicians and a third of whom became a lawyer. In addition to their Washington residence, they owned a summer home in Uniontown, Maryland. Francis died at his Washington home on May 23, 1913. Interment was at Woodlawn Cemetery in Washington, D.C.
