= William E. Matthews =

American lawyer

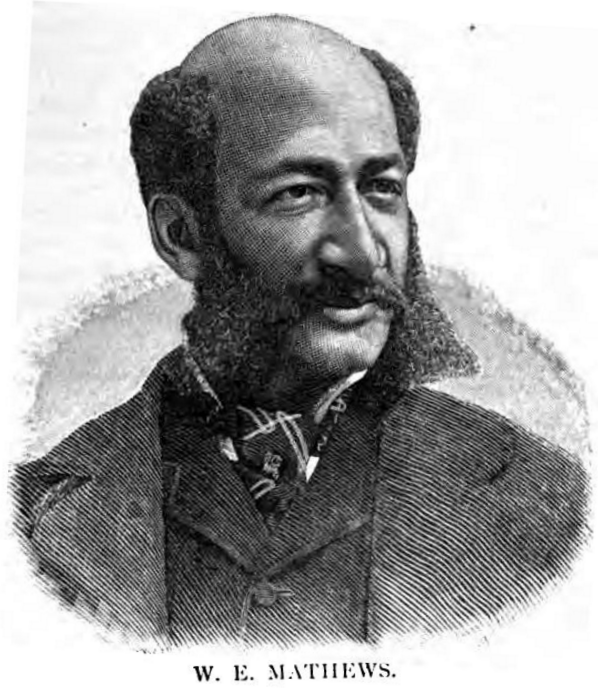
- Born: July , 1845; Baltimore, Maryland, U.S.
- Died: May 2, 1894 (aged 48); Washington, D.C., U.S.
- Education: Howard University
- Occupations: financier, lawyer
- Political party: Republican

William E. Matthews (July 1845 - May 2, 1894) was an African-American lawyer, financier, and civil rights activist in Baltimore, Maryland and Washington DC. He was active in promoting education for freedmen during and after the Civil War. He was very successful as a real estate and financial broker and was an important leader in African American society in the 1860s-1890s.

== Early life ==
William E. Matthews was born in Baltimore, Maryland in July 1845. His father died when Matthews was twelve and he assumed responsibility for the family.

He attended Howard University, where he was a student of John M. Langston. He graduated from the law department in 1873.

== Career ==
During the Civil War, Matthews was an agent of the Gilbraith Lyceum which was working for the education of black people in Maryland. Matthews' role including travelling throughout the state to help organize schools and discuss the transition of the people from slavery to citizenship. He also served as a pastor of a Baltimore church at this time.

After the war in 1867, he became an agent for a group organized by Bishop Daniel A. Payne to found schools and build churches among the freedmen throughout the southern United States. He continued with this work for three years. Part of his work involved his speaking at many wealthy churches in the northern states. His fundraising put him in contact with many leading intellectuals, including Henry Ward Beecher, Henry W. Longfellow, James Russell Lowell, Oliver Wendell Holmes, William Cullen Bryant, and John Greenleaf Whittier.

Matthews spent much of his spare time in real estate, amassing considerable wealth and experience. In 1870, he was appointed clerk in the United States Postal Service in Washington D.C., the first African-American to receive an appointment in that department. In 1881, he resigned from the postal service and opened a real estate and broker's office in the Le Droit Building in Washington D.C. He was very successful in his business and his clients included Frederick Douglass, Daniel Payne, Charles Burleigh Purvis, and John M. Brown.

Matthews was also worked for civil rights and participated in the Colored Conventions Movement. He worked with John M. Langston and Frederick Douglass to organize Blacks to work for civil rights. Matthews and Douglass were elected representatives of a New York convention in 1892 and met with President Benjamin Harrison to discuss lynchings and violence against blacks throughout the south.

== Personal life ==
Matthews was a member of the 15th Street Presbyterian Church in Washington D.C. and was the chairman of its board of trustees. He was a noted orator, giving a eulogy to the Unitarian preacher and abolitionist John Fothergill Waterhouse Ware. He contributed to the A.M.E. Church Review. He was also an active Republican. Matthews died in the early morning of May 2, 1894.
