= Edward Augustine Savoy =

American bureaucrat (1855–1943)

Edward Augustine Savoy (May 2, 1855 – August 24, 1943) had a federal career that spanned 64 years. He was first hired as a page in the State Department by United States Secretary of State Hamilton Fish on July 1, 1871. Savoy worked for 21 secretaries of the state through 14 presidencies, from President Ulysses S. Grant to Franklin D. Roosevelt. When he retired in 1933 at the age of 77, he had just concluded his service as Chief Messenger to Secretary of State, Henry L. Stimson.

== Early life and parents ==
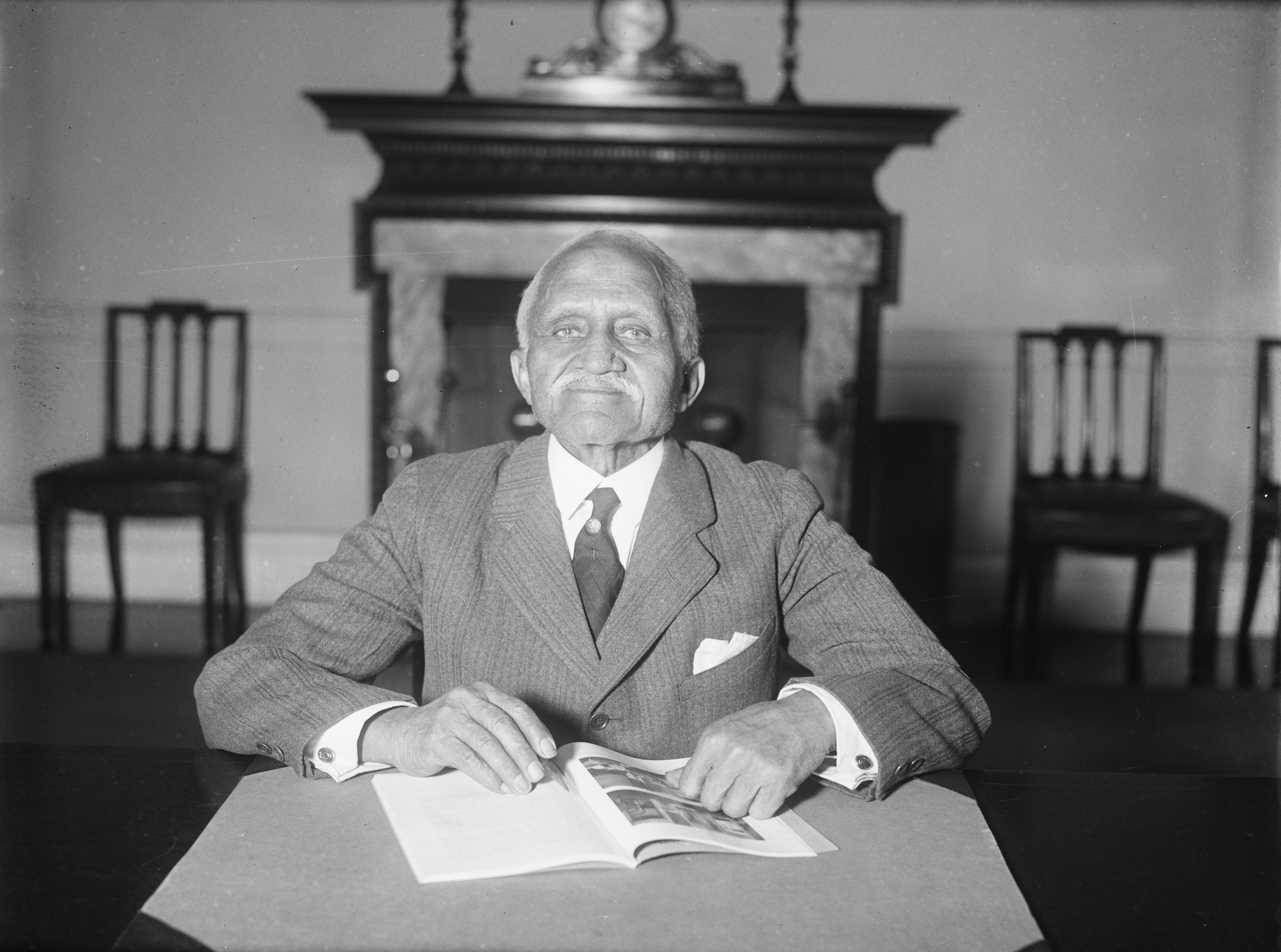
"Eddie" Augustine Savoy in 1931

In 1855, Edward Augustine Savoy was born a free man in Washington, DC, to Edward Louis Savoy and Elizabeth E. Van Rhoda Butler Savoy. His father, Edward Louis Savoy born enslaved, held many trades and was a caterer in Washington, catering events at the White House and at the opening reception of the Corcoran Art Gallery. Edward Louis Savoy served as a committee member of the First District Colored Regiment returning from the Civil War, and served as a delegate who petitioned the United States Congress for the right to suffrage.

His mother, Elizabeth E. Van Rhoda Butler Savoy, was a maid and later became a school teacher in the District of Columbia's segregated school system. She was active in the antislavery movement and aided the Underground Railroad by helping escaped slaves make their way to Canada and freedom. His parents worked as maid and butler for Secretary of State, Hamilton Fish, who later hired Edward Augustine at the age of 14. Edward Augustine Savoy was educated in the District of Columbia Public School System.

== Career ==
"Eddie", as he was familiarly known by leading diplomats and top-ranking officials of the Federal Government, began his career in public service in 1869, classified first as a page, and later as a messenger to Secretary of State Hamilton Fish, eventually serving under twenty-two secretaries. In 1901, from Secretary John Hay onward, Savoy was assigned to staff the diplomatic anterooms of the Secretaries of State where it was his task to delicately usher diplomats in and out of the office, often avoiding conflicts between ambassadors at odds with each other, and on occasion to serve passports to departing diplomats.

Eddie handed passports to: Luis Polo y Barnabé, the Spanish ambassador, forcing his departure from the United States when war was declared on Spain in 1898; Lord Sackville-West, the British envoy sent home by President Cleveland; and to the Austrian Charge d' Affaire when the United States entered the First World War.

Savoy was attendant to, and courier for many important international treaties, frequently the presenter of ceremonial pens, and seals for the proceedings. He and fellow messenger William Gwin were present for the signing of the Hay-Pauncefote Treaty on Nov. 18, 1901, opening way for the construction of the Panama Canal. On Nov. 25, 1905, Savoy was one of few witnesses to the final steps of the exchange of ratifications of the Treaty of Portsmouth of September earlier that fall, to end the war between Russia and Japan.

In 1931, after 59 years of service, and even though Savoy was past retirement age, Congressman (NY) Hamilton Fish II introduced a bill to extend his term of service. By special arrangements made by Secretary Stimson, he remained at his post another two years. After 64 years of service, on March 12, 1933, President Roosevelt personally sent a car to bring Edward A. Savoy to the White House to bestow formal congratulations upon him at his retirement.

== Memorials ==
Edward "Eddie" Augustine Savoy died at the age of 88, on August 24, 1943. Many national papers carried the news.

Savoy is buried in the Woodlawn Cemetery, in the Benning Ridge neighborhood of Washington DC.

In 1944, the SS Edward A Savoy was named in his honor, one of 18 US Liberty Ships built during WWII that were named after prominent African Americans. The ship was christened in the Bethlehem-Fairfield Shipyard, Baltimore, Maryland on July 16, 1944.

== Additional links ==
- Savoy, Lauret E. OpEd: "Early African-American workers in DC were more than silent witnesses". Christian Science Monitor. Sept. 13, 2013
- Historic Films Archive. HD Collection - Washington DC: Eddie Savoy (TC: 01.00.31)
