= The Bellamy Trial (novel) =

1927 novel

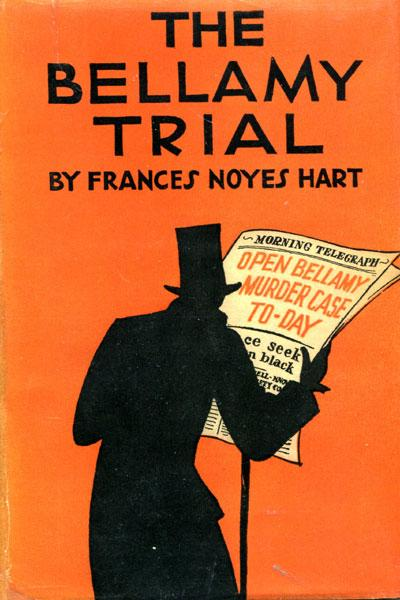
- Author: Frances Noyes Hart
- Language: English
- Genre: Mystery crime
- Publisher: Doubleday
- Publication date: 1927
- Publication place: United States
- Media type: Print

The Bellamy Trial is a 1927 mystery crime novel by the American writer Frances Noyes Hart. It was inspired by the Hall–Mills murder case of 1922. In 1948 it was awarded the Grand Prix de Littérature Policière in France.

== Adaptations ==
It was adapted into the 1929 American part-talkie film The Bellamy Trial directed by Monta Bell. Made by Metro-Goldwyn-Mayer it starred Leatrice Joy, Betty Bronson and Edward J. Nugent.

== Bibliography ==
- Goble, Alan. The Complete Index to Literary Sources in Film. Walter de Gruyter, 1999.
- Kabatchnik, Amnon. Blood on the Stage, 1925-1950: Milestone Plays of Crime, Mystery and Detection. Scarecrow Press, 2010.
