= Ingleside (Washington, D.C.) =

Historic house in Washington, D.C., United States

- U.S. National Register of Historic Places
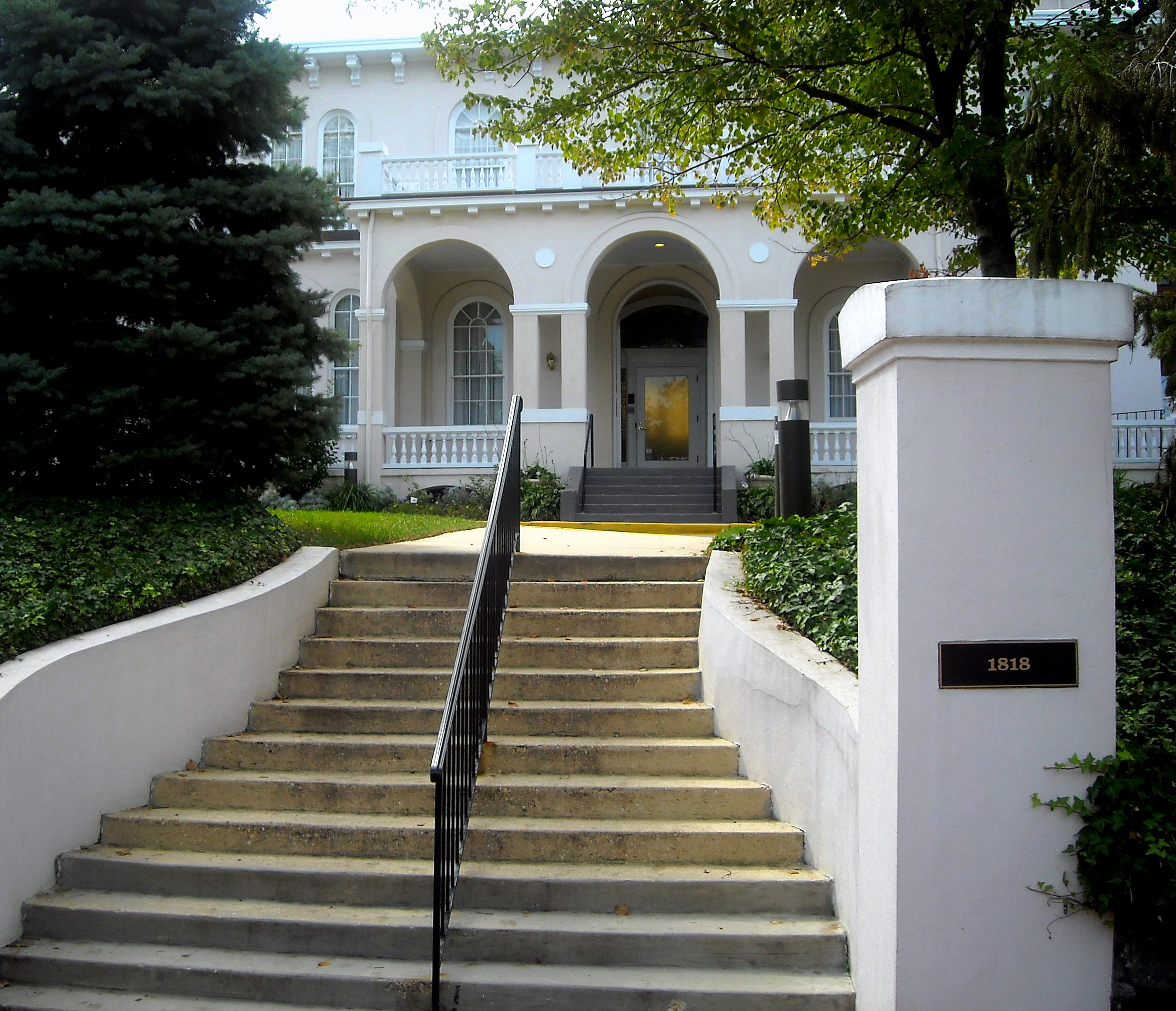

- Location within District of Columbia
- Location: 1818 Newton St., NW; Washington, D.C.
- Coordinates: 38°56′1″N 77°2′35″W
- Built: c. 1850
- Architect: Thomas U. Walter
- Architectural style: Italian Villa
- NRHP reference No.: 86002936
- Added to NRHP: January 8, 1987

Ingleside is a historic house in the Mount Pleasant neighborhood of Washington, D.C. The house was designed by architect Thomas U. Walter and completed around 1850. From 1896 to 1904, it was owned by Thomas C. Noyes, an editor, part-owner, and publisher of the Washington Evening Star and owner of the Washington Senators baseball team.

It has been listed on the District of Columbia Inventory of Historic Sites since 1979 and it was listed on the National Register of Historic Places in 1987. It is a contributing property in the Mount Pleasant Historic District.
