= Frank Brett Noyes =

American journalist (1863–1948)

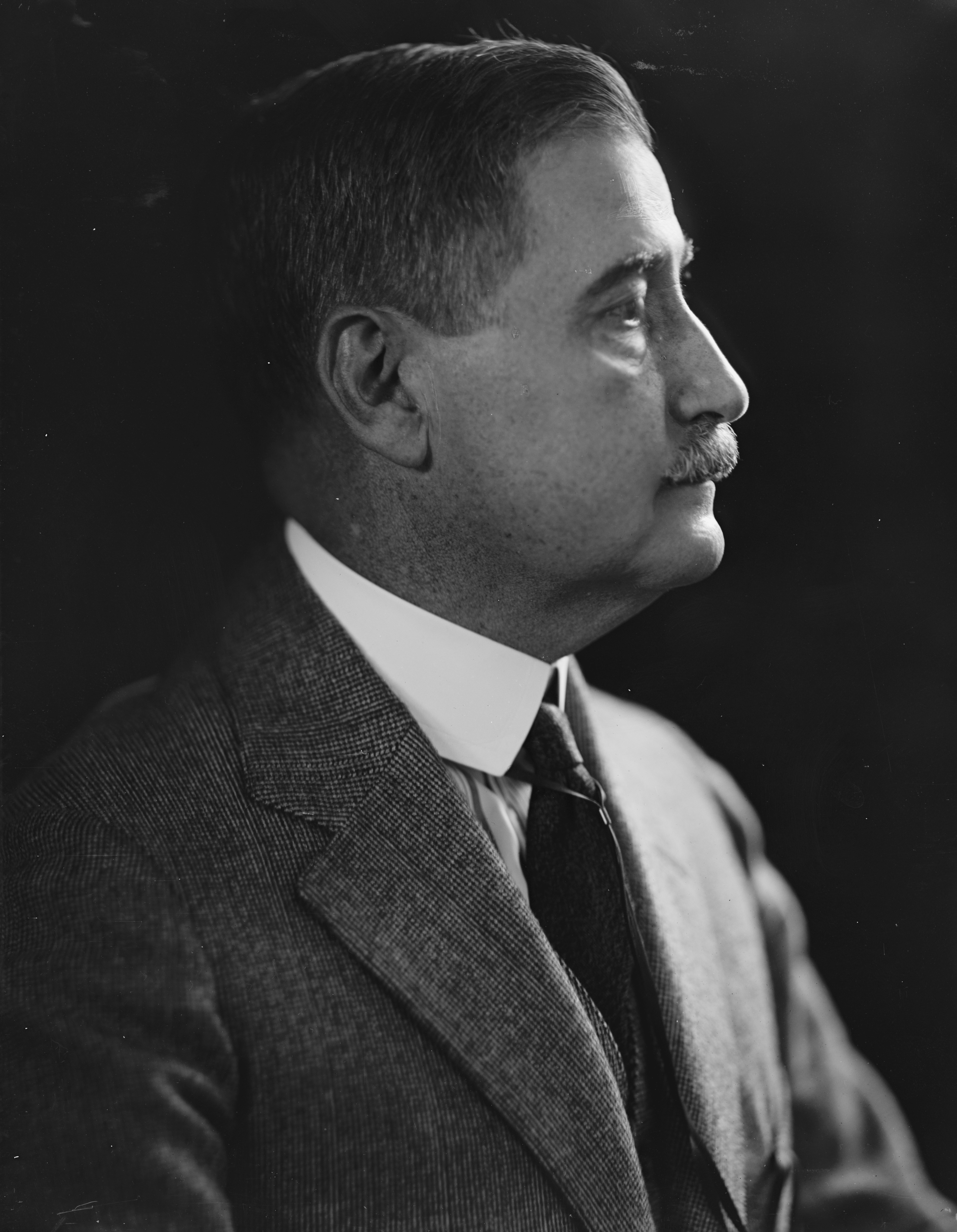
- Noyes, 1905–1945
- Born: July 7, 1863; Washington, D.C.
- Died: December 1, 1948 (aged 85); Washington, D.C.
- Employer: Washington Evening Star
- Spouse: Janet Thurston Newbold
- Children: Frances Newbold Noyes; Newbold Noyes Sr. Ethel J. Noyes Lewis
- Parent(s): Crosby Stuart Noyes; Elizabeth S. Williams

Frank Brett Noyes (July 7, 1863 - December 1, 1948) was president of the Washington Evening Star, a daily afternoon newspaper published in Washington, D.C., and a founder of the Associated Press. He was a son of the Star's publisher Crosby Stuart Noyes.

== Biography ==
Noyes was born in Washington, D.C., on July 7, 1863. He attended public schools in Washington and later went to the preparatory school of Columbian College (which later became George Washington University), but did not complete a degree. Instead, in 1881 he began to work in the Evening Star's business department full time, though he had already worked for the Star in his spare time during high school and college.

He was manager and treasurer for the Star from 1887 to 1901. From 1901 to 1910 he lived in Chicago and edited the Chicago Recorder-Herald while remaining a director of the Evening Star, and moved back to Washington in 1910 to become president of the Evening Star Newspaper Company.

Beginning in 1893, Noyes became involved with the formation of the Associated Press and was elected its president in 1900, retiring only in 1938.

He married Janet Thurston Newbold on September 17, 1888. They had four children: Crosby (died in infancy), Frances Newbold Noyes, Newbold Noyes Sr., and Ethel.

== Quotes ==
"Circumstances compel me to be an intellectual eunuch." Quoted in Time magazine, explaining why he didn't offer opinions on public issues.
