= Hall–Mills murder case =

American murder case

- Location: Franklin Township, New Jersey, U.S.
- Date: September 14, 1922; 104 years ago
- Attack type: Double-murder by shooting, mutilation
- Victims: Edward Wheeler Hall and Eleanor Reinhardt Mills
- Accused: Frances Noel Stevens Hall; Henry Hewgill Stevens; William Carpender Stevens; Henry de la Bruyere Carpender
- Charges: Murder
- Verdict: Frances, Henry and William Stevens: Not guilty Henry Carpender: Charge dropped

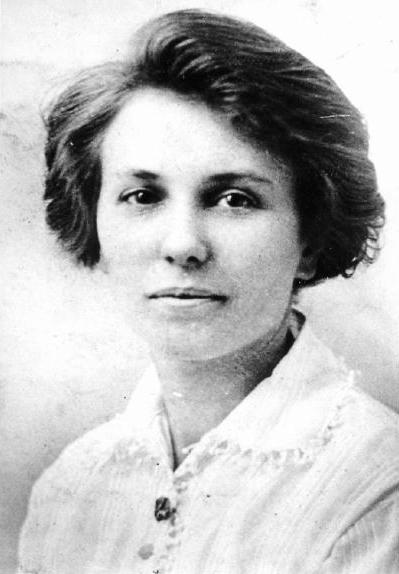
Eleanor Reinhardt Mills (1888–1922) was the wife of James Mills, and one of the murder victims.

Frances Noel Stevens Hall (1874–1942), widow of victim Edward Wheeler Hall and a defendant in the 1926 murder trial.

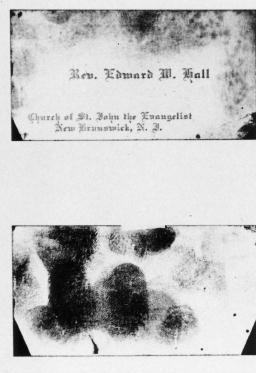
A calling card of Reverend Edward Wheeler Hall was found at the Hall-Mills murders crime scene in 1922.

The Hall–Mills murder case involved Edward Wheeler Hall, an Episcopal priest, and Eleanor Mills, a member of his choir with whom he was having an affair, both of whom were murdered on September 14, 1922, in Franklin Township, New Jersey, United States. Hall's wife and her brothers were accused of committing the murders, but were acquitted in a 1926 trial. In the history of journalism, the case is largely remembered for the vast, nationwide newspaper coverage it received, unusual for a local murder case at that time; it has been regarded as an early example of a media circus. It would take the Lindbergh kidnapping trial in the 1930s to eclipse the high profile of the Hall-Mills case.

== Discovery of the bodies ==
On September 16, 1922, the bodies of Eleanor Mills and Edward Hall were discovered in a field near a farm in Somerset County, New Jersey. Both bodies were on their backs, both shot in the head with a .32-caliber pistol, the man once and the woman three times. The bullet entered the man's head over his right ear and exited through the back of his neck. The woman was shot under the right eye, over the right temple and over the right ear. A police officer at the scene noticed that the woman's throat had been severed, and maggots were already in the wound, indicating the death occurred at least 24 hours earlier.

The bodies appeared to have been positioned side by side after death. Both had their feet pointing toward a crab apple tree. The man had a hat covering his face, and his calling card was placed at his feet. Torn-up love letters were placed between the bodies.

A jurisdictional issue complicated the initial investigation, as the crime scene was near the border between Somerset County and Middlesex County. New Brunswick (Middlesex County) police arrived first, but the crime scene was actually in Franklin Township (Somerset County). While the authorities addressed the confusion, curiosity-seekers trampled the scene, took souvenirs, and passed Hall's calling card among the crowd. The physical evidence was thus severely compromised.

The woman was identified as Eleanor Reinhardt Mills (born 1888), the wife of James E. Mills (1878–1965). She was wearing a blue dress with red polka dots, black silk stockings, and brown shoes. She had worn a blue velvet hat that was on the ground near her body, and her brown silk scarf was wrapped around her throat. Her arm had a bruise and there was a tiny cut on her lip. Her left hand had been positioned to touch the man's right thigh.

The man was identified as Edward Wheeler Hall (born 1881), a New Brunswick Episcopal priest. He was found with his right arm positioned to touch the woman's neck. His hat covered his face, which concealed the gunshot wound to his head. He wore a pair of glasses. There was a small bruise on the tip of his ear, and abrasions were found on his left little finger and right index finger. A wound was found five inches (127 mm) below his kneecap, on the calf of his right leg. His gold watch was missing, and there were coins in his pocket.

== Investigation ==
The suspects in the murder were Hall's wife, Frances Noel Stevens, her two brothers, Henry Hewgill Stevens and William "Willie" Carpender Stevens, and a cousin, Henry de la Bruyere Carpender. The original 1922 investigation by Joseph E. Stricker (1870–1926) yielded no indictments. Continued speculation in the New York Daily Mirror, fueled by comments made by a man associated with one of Mrs. Hall's housekeepers, led Governor A. Harry Moore to order a second investigation and a trial in 1926. Henry Carpender won a bid to be tried separately from the three others accused; ultimately, he was never tried.

== Trial ==
The Hall–Mills trial began on November 3, 1926, at the Somerset County Courthouse in Somerville, with Charles W. Parker and Frank Cleary presiding as judges. It lasted about thirty days and garnered huge national attention, largely because of the social status of the wealthy Stevens and Carpender families. The prosecuting attorney was Alexander Simpson. Defense attorneys were Robert H. McCarter (a former New Jersey Attorney General) and Timothy N. Pfeiffer. Joseph A. Faurot was the testifying fingerprint expert. Raymond C. Stryker was the foreman of the jury.

The prosecution's key witness was Jane Gibson, a pig farmer on whose property the bodies were discovered. The defense portrayed Gibson as uneducated and "crazy", and attempted to ruin her credibility. Gibson's account varied, differing when told to the police, to newspapers, and at the trial (at which she testified from a hospital bed rolled into the court room).

All three defendants at trial were acquitted of charges on December 3, 1926.

== Victims ==
=== Eleanor Reinhardt Mills ===
Eleanor Reinhardt was married to James E. Mills. They lived at 49 Carman Street in New Brunswick, New Jersey. James was acting sexton at St. John the Evangelist Episcopal Church and full-time janitor at the Lord Stirling Elementary School, both in New Brunswick. Eleanor and James had two children, Charlotte E. Mills (1906–1952) and Daniel Mills (1910–1992). Eleanor, James, and their children were buried in Van Liew Cemetery, North Brunswick.

=== Edward Wheeler Hall ===
Edward Wheeler Hall married Frances Noel Stevens on July 20, 1911. He was raised in Brooklyn, New York, receiving his theological degree in Manhattan. After graduation, he moved from New York to Basking Ridge, New Jersey, and then to St. John the Evangelist Episcopal Church in New Brunswick. Edward was living at 23 Nichol Avenue in New Brunswick at the time of the murder. He was buried in Green-Wood Cemetery in Brooklyn.

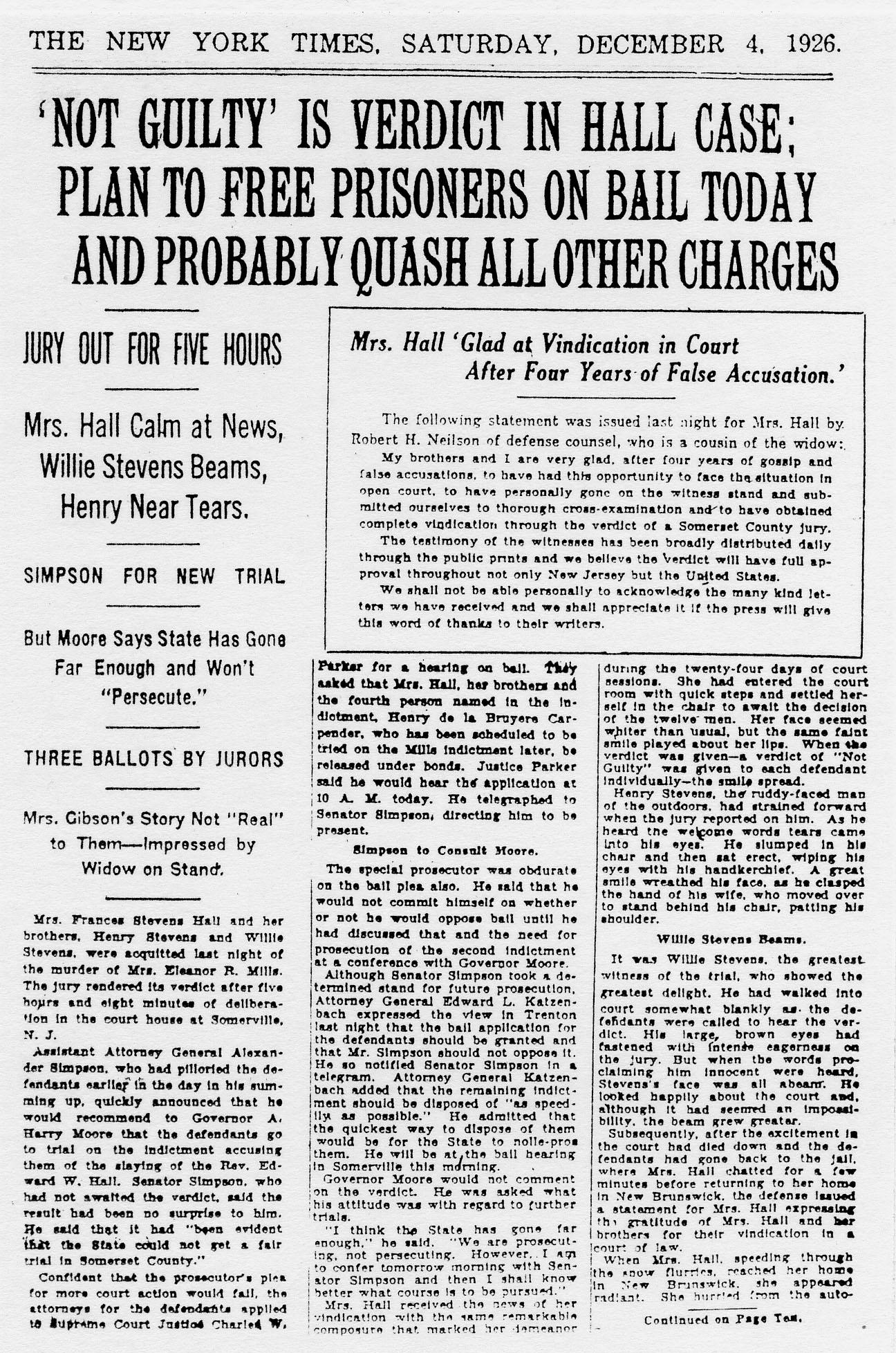
The New York Times; December 4, 1926

== Suspects ==
=== Henry de la Bruyere Carpender ===
Henry de la Bruyere Carpender (1882–1934) was born on May 15, 1882, to John Neilson Carpender and Anna Neilson Kemp. He lived with his wife Mary Nielson at the corner of Suydam Street and Nichol Avenue in New Brunswick. Henry was a cousin of Frances Stevens Hall and her brothers, whose mother was a Carpender. He worked as a Wall Street stockbroker. Although he was an initial suspect, he was never brought to trial. He died on May 26, 1934 due to a blood clot after several years of paralysis from a stroke, and was buried in Elmwood Cemetery, North Brunswick.

=== Frances Noel Stevens Hall ===
Frances Noel Stevens was born on January 13, 1874, to Francis Kerby Stevens (1840–1874) and Mary Noel Carpender (1840–1919). Frances and Edward married on July 20, 1911. Hall died after a long illness at her home at 23 Nichol Avenue in New Brunswick on December 19, 1942. She was buried on December 21, 1942, in Green-Wood Cemetery in Brooklyn, New York, with her husband. In the prosecution's scenario, she instigated the murder of her cheating husband. Her home was later bought by Rutgers University and used as the residence of the Dean of Douglass Residential College. Mrs. Hall was related to many of the wealthy families of New Brunswick, including the Carpenders, Nielsons, and possibly the Johnsons of Johnson & Johnson.

=== Henry Hewgill Stevens ===
Henry Hewgill Stevens (1869–1939) was born on November 10, 1869. He married Ethel Griffin on June 27, 1901. He was a retired exhibition marksman and lived in Lavallette, New Jersey. The prosecution contended that he fired the shots. Henry testified that he was fishing miles away from the murder on the night of the killing, and three witnesses corroborated his testimony. He died of a heart attack on December 3, 1939, the 13th anniversary of the acquittal, in Lavallette, New Jersey while preparing for a trip to Florida.

=== William Carpender Stevens ===
William "Willie" Carpender Stevens (1872–1942) was born on March 13, 1872. He owned a .32-caliber pistol like the one used in the murder, although the firing mechanism was supposed to have been filed down so that he could not hurt himself with it. In the prosecution's scenario, he provided the weapon, and his fingerprint was found on a calling card left at the scene of the crime. Willie was a colorful character on the witness stand, delivering credible and not unsympathetic testimony. He was incapable of holding a job and spent most of his time hanging out at a local firehouse. Willie's eccentric personality was consistent with high-functioning autism, but the condition had not yet been clinically described, and no conclusive diagnosis can be made. Stevens died on December 30, 1942, 11 days after the death of his sister.

== Witness ==
=== Jane Gibson, the "pig woman" ===
Jane Gibson (ca 1870–1930) and her son William lived in an old barn that had been converted into living space, just off De Russey's Lane (now Franklin Boulevard). The press called her the "pig woman" because she raised hogs. She told the investigators that her dog was barking loudly about 9:00 pm on the night of the murder. She went outside of her house and saw a man standing in her cornfield. She rode her mule toward Easton Avenue to approach the man. As she got closer she saw that there were four people standing near a crab apple tree. She heard gunshots and one of the figures fell to the ground, presumably dead. She testified that a woman screamed "Don't!" three times. She said she turned her mule in the opposite direction and headed back to her house, then heard more gunshots; when she looked back at the tree, she saw a second person fall down, presumably dead. She testified that she had heard a woman shout the name "Henry."

Gibson was admitted to Jersey City Hospital on January 28, 1930. She would eventually fall unconscious and passed away on February 7, 1930.

== Case and trial in fact and fiction ==
After the trial, Mrs. Hall brought a defamation suit against the New York Daily Mirror, which was settled out of court for an unspecified large amount. The New York Times' accounts were actually more voluminous, but less slanted; they reported on all aspects of the trial and dedicated more space to the Hall-Mills case than any previous trial in American history. (That record would soon be eclipsed by another New Jersey trial, the Lindbergh case.)

The Hall-Mills murders have been much examined in both fiction and non-fiction. Damon Runyon was one of the reporters of the trial, as were famed mystery novelist Mary Roberts Rinehart, H. L. Mencken, and Billy Sunday. Willie Stevens was later the subject of an essay by James Thurber. The trial inspired the novel The Crime by Stephen Longstreet as well as Frances Noyes Hart's novel The Bellamy Trial, a pioneering work that helped establish the genre of the courtroom mystery and was turned into a film in 1929. Even before the trial, the silent film The Goose Woman (1925), starring Louise Dresser and Jack Pickford, capitalized on Jane Gibson's story and statements; the film was remade as The Past of Mary Holmes in 1933.

Attorney and liberal activist William Kunstler published a 1964 book titled The Minister and the Choir Singer, which he re-released with added editorial material in 1980 as The Hall-Mills Murders. In his book, Kunstler theorized that the Ku Klux Klan had been responsible for the couple's demise, based on the facts that the Klan was a very violent organization and was active in New Jersey in the 1920s. But he acknowledged that the Klan had not previously killed anyone in the state, and could only speculate on why the KKK would target this particular couple, both of whom were white and uninvolved in racial politics. Fictional detective Nero Wolfe reads this book in A Right to Die, while investigating a similar situation.

Gerald Tomlinson's Fatal Tryst: Who Killed the Minister and the Choir Singer? is the most detailed exploration of the case written to date and concludes that the Stevens siblings were the guilty parties.

Additional images and a more detailed account of the local perspective and effect on the once-rural community of Franklin Township can be found in books written by William B. Brahms.

In 2012, Rick Geary released a graphic novel based on the case, titled Lovers' Lane: The Hall-Mills Mystery. It is one in the series, "A Treasury of XXth Century Murder".

In her book Careless People: Murder, Mayhem and the Invention of The Great Gatsby (2013), Sarah Churchwell speculates that parts of the ending of The Great Gatsby (1925), by F. Scott Fitzgerald, were based on the Hall-Mills Case. Based on her forensic search for clues, she asserts that the two victims in the Halls-Mills murder case inspired the characters who were murdered in The Great Gatsby.

The non-fiction book Blood and Ink: The Scandalous Jazz Age Double Murder that Hooked America on True Crime (2022), by Joe Pompeo, considers the Hall-Mills murder from the standpoint of the media coverage and its general effect on the treatment of crime in contemporary newspapers and magazines.

== See also ==
- List of unsolved murders (1900–1979)
