= Thomas C. Noyes =

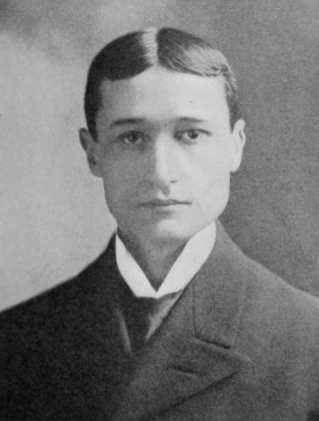
Thomas C. Noyes

Thomas Clarence Noyes (January 14, 1868 – August 21, 1912) was an American newspaper editor and baseball executive. From 1904 until his death, he co-owned the Washington Senators of the American League, with Ban Johnson.

== Biography ==
Noyes was born in Washington, D.C. on January 14, 1868, a son of Crosby Stuart Noyes and Elizabeth S. Noyes (née Williams). He graduated from Princeton University in 1889.

He was an editor, part-owner, and publisher of the Washington Evening Star when he bought the club from Ban Johnson and Fred Postal. The team was an also-ran for most of his tenure, the only highlight being the acquisition of Walter Johnson in 1907. Things really didn't turn around until Clark Griffith took over as manager in 1912.

From 1896 to 1904, Noyes owned Ingleside, an 1851 villa designed by Thomas Ustick Walter in the modern-day Mount Pleasant neighborhood.

Noyes died suddenly of pneumonia on August 21, 1912 at a Washington, D.C. hospital. He was 44.

The Senators were later sold to a group headed by Griffith in 1919.
