= William B. Derrick =

Bishop & missionary (1843–1913)

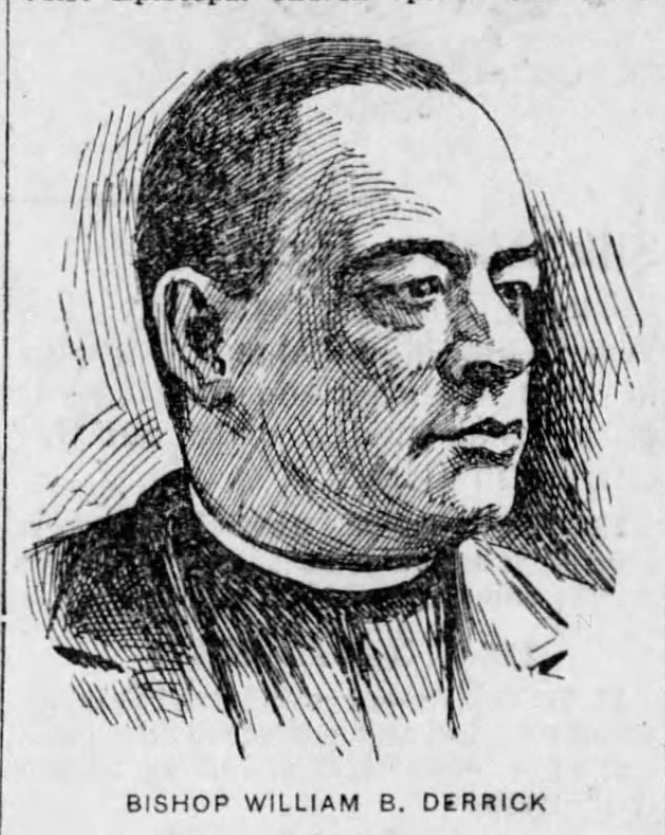
- Sketch of Derrick from newspaper article in 1900
- Born: July 27, 1843; Antigua
- Died: April 15, 1913 (aged 69); Flushing, New York
- Occupations: Minister, civil rights activist

Personal life

Religious life
- Religion: African Methodist Episcopal

William B. Derrick (July 27, 1843 – April 15, 1913) was an African Methodist Episcopal (AME) bishop and missionary. He began his career as a seaman and later served in the Union Navy during the US Civil War. Following the war, he transitioned to the AME church, where he became actively engaged in church leadership and missionary work. In 1896, he ascended to the position of bishop within the church. Additionally, Derrick was a prominent figure in Republican politics and an advocate for civil rights.

== Early life and naval service ==
William B. Derrick was born on the Island of Antigua in the British West Indies July 27, 1843. His father, Thomas J. Derrick was from a large planter family on the island. He attended a public school at Gracefield run by Moravians from 1848 to 1856. He then went to a select private high school for three years. He trained to become a blacksmith. After this, he went to sea. He enlisted as a sailor from 1861 to 1864. and served on the Minnesota, the flagship of the North Atlantic Squadron, during the battle of the Merrimac and the Monitor. In his naval records he was described as being five feet five inches and having a tattoo of "W. B. D." on his right forearm.

Shortly after his military service, William B. Derrick married Mary E. White, the daughter of Edwin White. Mary died shortly after their marriage. Derrick remarried to Lillian M. around 1882, who died in 1907. Subsequently, in 1909, he entered into his third marriage with Clara E. Henderson Jones.

== AME church ==
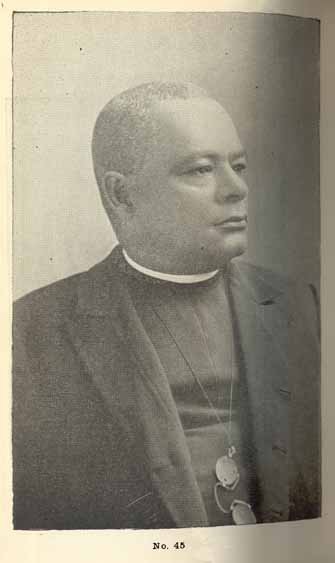
Bishop William B. Derrick (1843–1913) of the African Methodist Episcopal Church, photographed in 1906

In 1866, he joined the AME church under John M. Brown, who licensed him to preach and act as a missionary agent, roles which he held until 1867. Bishop Daniel A. Payne appointed Derrick to Mt. Pisgah Chapel in Washington, D.C., in 1867. In 1868, he was ordained as a deacon. Subsequently, he was elected as an elder, ordained, and appointed as the presiding elder of the Staunton church and district. He held the positions of presiding elder, pastor, and conference secretary at every Virginia Conference in the 1870s and participated in the general AME conferences in Nashville in 1872, Atlanta in 1876, and Baltimore in 1884. He became involved in a controversy in Virginia state politics in 1879 when he supported paying the state debt against others who favored debt readjustment. Finding himself on the losing end, he resigned his charge in Virginia, touring the West Indies with his wife before returning to ministry in New York State. He became the presiding elder over a large district encompassing New York, New Jersey, Pennsylvania, and New England. In 1888, he was elected as the missionary secretary.

In 1889, AME district bishop Benjamin Tucker Tanner was focused on missionary work in Haiti. In August, it was discovered that the mission treasury was empty. Derrick, in his role as the mission secretary, was held responsible, and Payne demanded an explanation from Derrick regarding the missing funds. Derrick had been providing money to the Haitian mission in cash, which was not inherently problematic but could have potentially led to the misuse of funds. Tanner was initially reluctant to mediate the dispute, but Derrick improved his standing in the eyes of AME leaders over the next few years, and the two reconciled.

In 1896 he was elected bishop, and served as bishop in the eighth, first, third, and fifteenth Episcopal districts. As bishop, Derrick played an important role in missionary activities in the church. In the 1900s, Derrick traveled to widely, and worked to expand the AME church in Africa.

== Political and civil rights activism ==
Outside of the church, Derrick was very active in politics. In June 1884 he was nominated a presidential elector-at-large for the Republican State Committees with the support of Cornelius Van Cott, but he declined after questions arose to his citizenship, although he had taken an oath and became a citizen when he enlisted in the navy 23 years earlier. Derrick purchased interest in the New York Globe from George Parker in November 1884 with a goal of making it a more thoroughly Republican paper. Derrick and co-editor T. Thomas Fortune disagreed over the direction of the paper and the paper entered default and was later resurrected by Fortune.

At the end of the century, Derrick was especially active in civil rights. Derrick was a member of the Afro-American Council a part of its organization by Fortune in 1897 in Chicago. Derrick in New York and Benjamin W. Arnett in Ohio were leaders of the AME Republicans in the late 1890s and early 1900s. Derrick supported licensed female preachers but not female ordained ministers. In September 1892, Derrick gave a speech at a meeting of Wong Chin Foo's Chinese Equal Rights League opposing the Geary Act.

Derrick was proud of his military service and supported numerous military and patriot causes. He was prominent among those who urged retaliation for the sinking of the Maine in 1898 which in part led to the Spanish–American War. Derrick was selected to deliver a sermon and prayer prior to the dedicatory address at the 1893 Grand Army of the Republic reunion at the dedication of the statue of Victory at the New York State monument at the Gettysburg Battlefield.

His sermons were reported in various newspapers. He was given a D. D. degree from Wilberforce University in 1885. He was friends with Bishop Richard H. Cain and served as executor of his will. He worked closely with James G. Blaine, Benjamin Harrison, and William McKinley. Derrick frequently traveled to England and was a popular speaker there.

Along with the Globe, at one point Derrick owned the journal, the West Indian Abroad. Derrick was affiliated with the Odd Fellows, Masons, Good Samaritans, and a trustee of Wilberforce University. He was a confidant and supporter of Booker T. Washington. He remained close to Antiguans in New York and in the West Indies throughout his life.

Derrick died April 15, 1913, in Flushing, New York.
