= Theodore W. Noyes =

American journalist

Theodore Williams Noyes
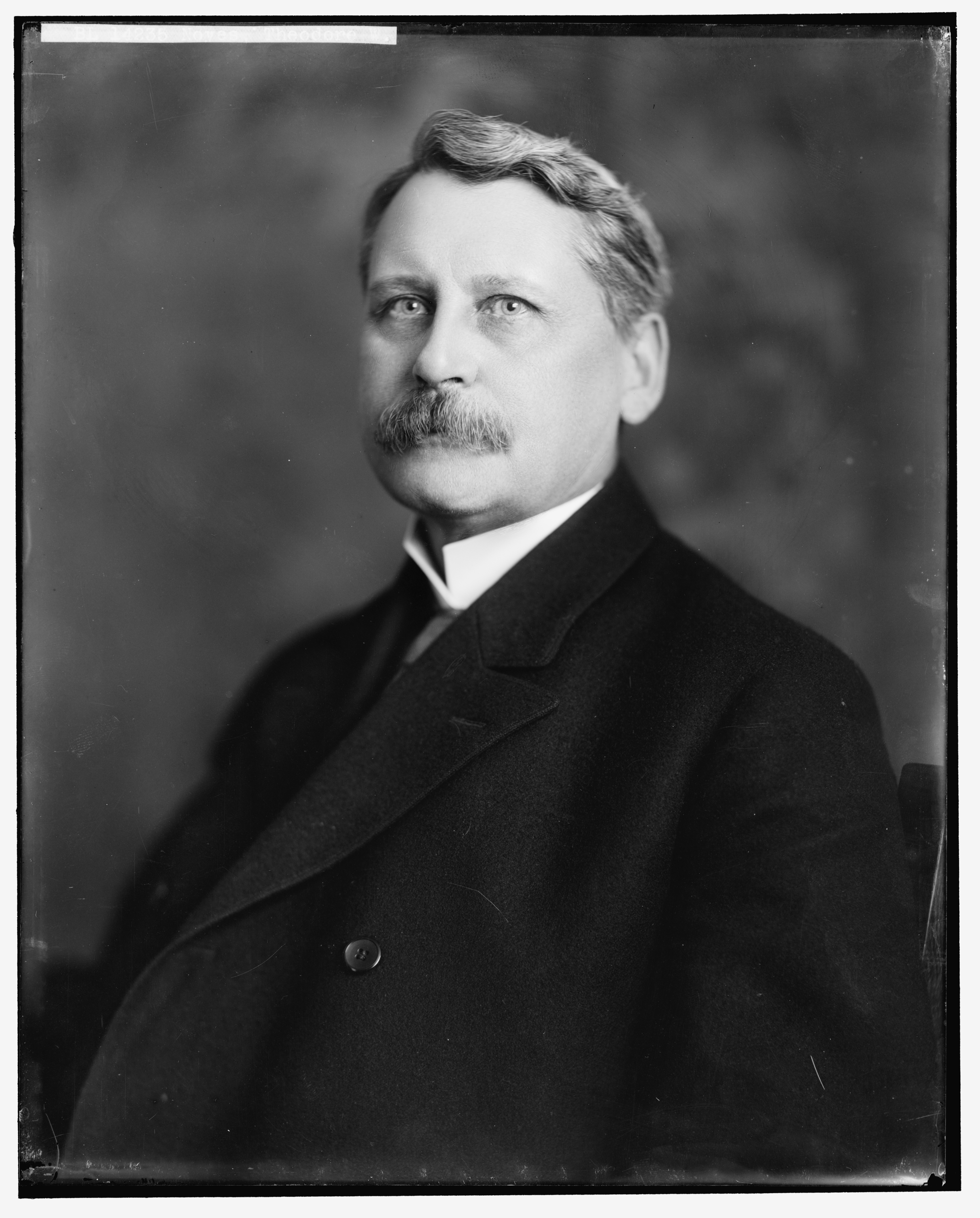
- Born: January 26, 1858; Washington, D.C., U.S.
- Died: July 4, 1946 (aged 88)
- Education: Columbian College (now George Washington University)
- Occupations: Journalist, editor-in-chief
- Employer(s): The Evening Star; Sioux Falls Press
- Writing career
- Years active: 1877–1946
- Genres: Non-fiction (on topics related to Washington D.C., foreign policy)
- Subjects: Washington D.C., foreign policy
- Notable works: War of the Metals (1899), Oriental America and its Problems (1903), The Presidents and the National Capital (1917), The National Capital: Newspaper Articles and Speeches Concerning the City of Washington (1893)

Theodore Williams Noyes (January 26, 1858 - July 4, 1946) was an American journalist. He was the editor-in-chief of Washington, D.C.'s Evening Star newspaper for 38 years.

He was the first son of Crosby Stuart Noyes and Elizabeth Selina Williams. After attending public schools in Washington, Theodore entered the preparatory program at Columbian College (which later became George Washington University) at age 12. In 1877, at the age of 19, he graduated with a Master of Arts degree and began his career as a reporter for the Star, of which his father Crosby Noyes had become part owner and editor in chief in 1867. After four years, he returned to Columbian to attend law school, receiving his LL.B. in 1882 and his LL.M. in 1883.

Upon graduation, he was in poor health from rheumatic fever and so did not return to the Star but accepted a job with the law firm Boyse, Noyes, and Boyse in the drier climate of Sioux Falls, Dakota Territory. He wrote a weekly column for the Sioux Falls Press, helped draft the plan for state government for the territory, and was elected county judge. But instead of taking office, he returned to Washington in 1886 to accept an associate editor's post at the Star.

As editor of the Star, Noyes led a successful campaign to forbid the use of trolley poles to power electric streetcars within the District of Columbia, deeming overhead wires aesthetically unacceptable. In 1889, Congress passed a law requiring streetcar companies in the District to replace horsecars with electrical systems that did not use overhead wires. Companies that operated in the District subsequently adopted a system that drew power from a conduit embedded between the rails, a system that was more difficult and expensive to build, operate, and maintain than overhead wiring. Still, a version of it was later implemented for London streetcars.

== Personal life ==
On August 11, 1886, he married Mary E. Prentice. They had three children, Ruth, Elizabeth, and Theodore Prentice. She died on November 16, 1928.
