= Frelinghuysen University =

University in Washington, D.C. (1906–c. 1960)

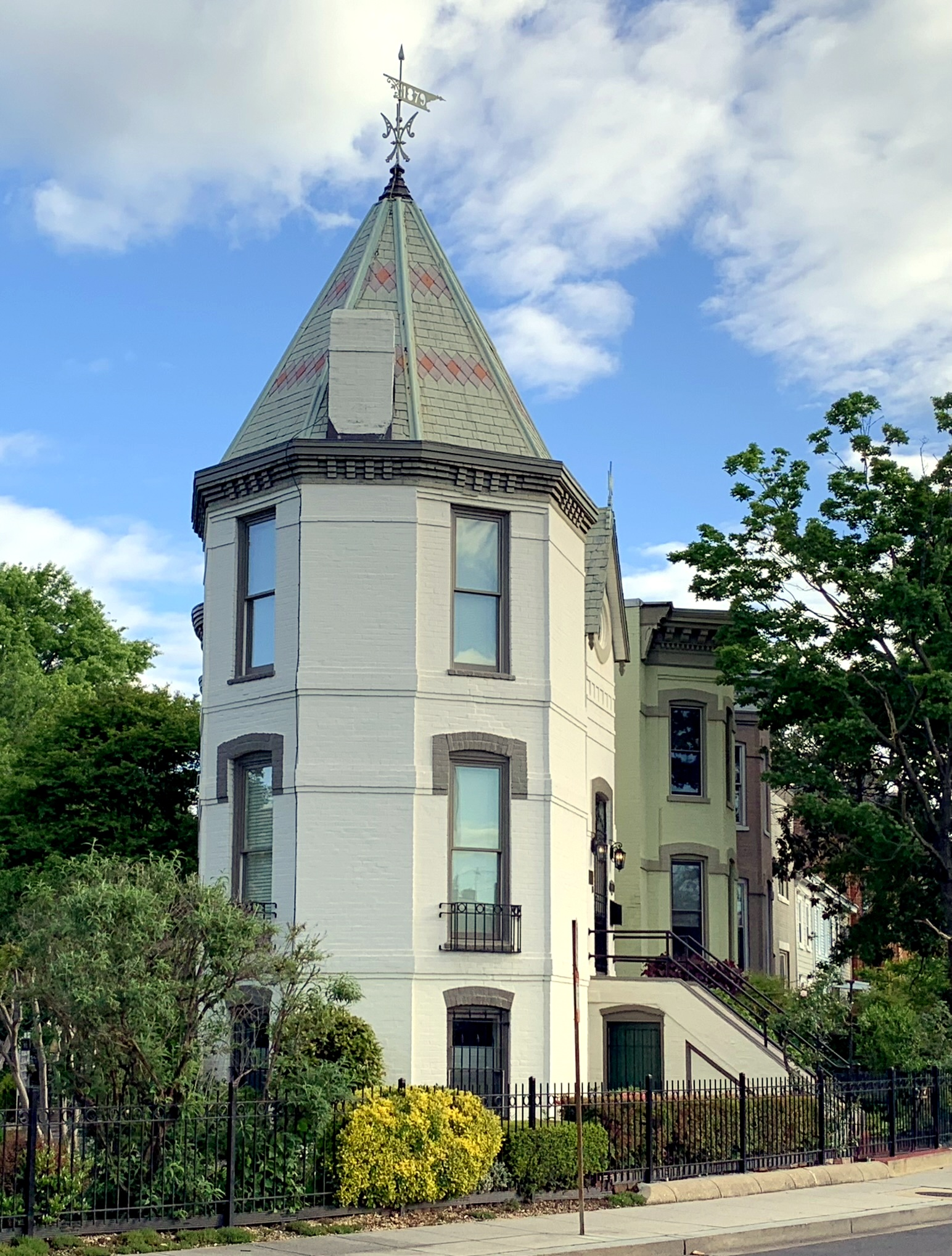
- Former classroom building at 1800 Vermont Avenue NW, Washington, D.C.
- Former names: Interdenominational Bible College and Bible Educational Association, until 1917
- Motto: Sic Itur Ad Astra
- Type: Private historically Black university, adult secondary education
- Active: April 27, 1906–c. 1960 (Note: Finn, writing for the DCist, says the school "dissolved in the late 1950s," while Chateauvert places the closing in 1960, and Johnson writes that the school remained open until Cooper died in 1964.)
- Founders: Jesse Lawson, Rosetta Lawson
- Religious affiliation: Nondenominational Christianity
- Location: Washington, D.C., U.S.
- Campus: Home college
- Frelinghuysen University
- U.S. National Register of Historic Places
- U.S. Historic district – Contributing property
- Location: 1800 Vermont Ave., NW; Washington, D.C.
- Coordinates: 38°54′54″N 77°1′37″W
- Built: 1879
- Architectural style: Queen Anne
- Part of: Greater U Street Historic District (ID98001557)
- NRHP reference No.: 95001228
- Added to NRHP: November 6, 1995

Frelinghuysen University was a private historically Black university in Washington, D.C., which was open from 1906 to c. 1960. It provided adult education and social services to poor and working-class African Americans. Founded by activists Jesse and Rosetta Lawson, it was the first school to offer evening and extension courses to African American students in Washington, D.C. Focused on providing service to the working poor, the university charged the lowest tuition possible and held classes in local homes and businesses to reduce commuting time for its students.

First presided over by Jesse Lawson and later by African American scholar Anna J. Cooper, the university offered programs for those with limited or no literacy and a full high school curriculum and courses at the undergraduate and graduate levels. The university was named after Frederick T. Frelinghuysen, a politician from New Jersey, for his support of African-American causes, and several of its schools were named in honor of other public servants who worked to support African Americans. The university's first permanent classroom building, located at 1800 Vermont Avenue in Northwest Washington, D.C., is listed on the National Register of Historic Places for its significance to African American education.

Following financial difficulties in the early 1930s and the loss of accreditation in 1937, the school changed its name to Frelinghuysen Group of Schools for Colored Working People in 1940. The university experienced a slow decline throughout the 1940s. Although not awarding degrees, the university still provided educational and social services to the African-American community that were otherwise unavailable during this time. By 1964, Frelinghuysen University had closed.

== History ==
=== 1906–1927 ===
On April 27, 1906, Jesse Lawson and educator and author Kelly Miller organized a branch of the Bible Educational Association in Lawson's home in Washington, D.C., with Miller as its president. Shortly after, Lawson and his wife, Rosetta Lawson, began the Interdenominational Bible College, a school aimed at uplifting the African-American working class. In 1917, the two organizations merged, forming Frelinghuysen University, with Jesse Lawson serving as president. The new university was named in honor of Frederick T. Frelinghuysen, a politician from New Jersey who served as United States Secretary of State under President Chester A. Arthur. Frelinghuysen was chosen for his support of African American causes while serving as a U.S. Senator. The schools in the university were named to memorialize others who had worked to support African Americans. During the time the university was open, these included the John M. Langston School of Law, the Jesse Lawson School of Religion, and the Hannah Stanley Opportunity School.

At the time of the university's founding, over three hundred schools provided evening and extension classes in the District of Columbia. Of those, only Frelinghuysen University admitted African-American students. The university also admitted White students, but the school was designed to cater to the needs of the African-American community. A non-traditional university, it aimed to provide a broad range of academic and religious educational programs and social services to working-class African Americans who had no other learning opportunities. Classes were held in the evenings to accommodate the adult students, allowing them to participate despite working during the day.

The university used a novel "home college" concept to keep costs low. Classes were originally held in the homes and businesses of those in the area, with the Lawsons' home being the first classroom. Running classes out of homes in the area also reduced commuting time to and from class, making it easier for working students to attend classes. To further ease the burden on the non-traditional student body, tuition was kept as low as possible and was billed at a monthly rate rather than charged per semester.

The university purchased its first permanent classroom building in 1921, a location that was later listed on the National Register of Historic Places. That building was sold in 1927, when the university purchased a larger property, with spaces for classrooms, libraries, offices, and dormitories.

Lawson served as university president for twenty-one years until he died in 1927. The growing interest in education among the African American community at this time contributed to the university's popularity, and under his leadership the school had broad appeal and reached a level of prominence in Washington, D.C.

=== 1928–1940 ===
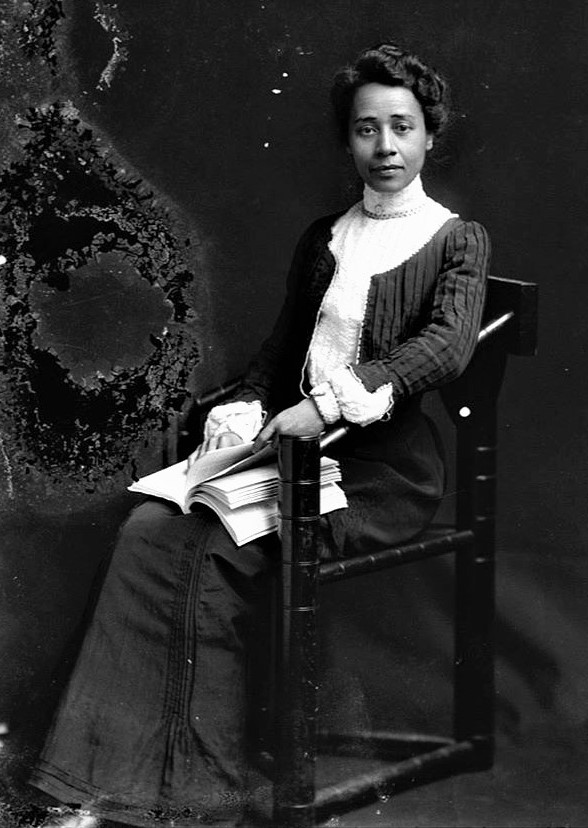
Anna J. Cooper, second president

In 1929, prominent African American scholar Anna J. Cooper was elected to succeed Jesse Lawson as president of the university, a post she assumed in 1930. Under Cooper's leadership in the 1930s, Frelinghuysen University focused on increasing literacy among the African-American working poor and providing liberal arts and vocational education for unskilled workers. In a 2009 paper for the journal African American Review, Karen A. Johnson describes Cooper's practice of "decolonizing pedagogy":

Cooper believed that the essential purpose for a "decolonizing" approach to adult education content was to assist her students in developing their abilities to question dominant thought ... Cooper's ultimate goal for her learning adults was their preparation for intellectual enlightenment as well as to equip them to battle for a better society at large.

The school struggled in the years after Lawson's death, and Cooper began her tenure by addressing the financial difficulties and debt the university had accrued. Attempts to raise enough money from the poor African-American alums to pay the university's financial obligations were not successful. Cooper stabilized the university's finances with budgeting and oversight, leading to a credit on the balance sheet by June 1931. Despite this, there were outstanding back payments on the property the university had purchased in 1927. Unable to raise enough money or secure an underwriter, that property was foreclosed on in 1931. Due to the loss of the building, Frelinghuysen University returned to its "home college" roots, and Cooper began hosting classes in her home.

The university was accredited and awarded degrees from 1927 until 1937. In the 1930s, educators and consumer advocates called for more stringent requirements for colleges providing degrees, which led to accreditation reforms. Despite her connections to the African-American members of the Board of Education, Cooper could not convince the board to maintain the university's accreditation, which was initially declined in 1936. The reason provided by the Board of Education for declining the application was that the school lacked a sufficient endowment. However, the view that Howard University already filled the needs of the African-American community also contributed. Because of the accreditation reforms, many colleges for African Americans lost accreditation, and by 1934, eighty percent of Black colleges in the U.S. were unaccredited.

The John M. Langston School of Law's 1936 application for accreditation was denied due to an insufficient law library and lack of enrollment. The school sued the Board of Education for the right to award bachelor's degrees in law. The attorney for the school, Louis Rothschild, argued that the school's law library was sufficient, and current inactivity at the school was not grounds for refusal. The denial was upheld in 1938, though the ruling stated that the school could still offer legal training.

Following the loss of accreditation, the university changed its name to the Frelinghuysen Group of Schools for Colored Working People in 1940. Although no longer accredited, the school still provided educational and social services to the African-American community that were otherwise unavailable. The school attracted significant community support, with the local Y.W.C.A. donating space for activities, the American Red Cross providing nursing training, and the Daughters of the American Revolution, despite their segregationist practices at the time, donating materials for civics courses. Private citizens and alums also provided support by donating time, expertise, and educational materials, such as African American scholar Carter G. Woodson, who oversaw the completion of a Frelinghuysen student's master's degree in history. Because of this support, the school could maintain a fair-sized library for its students.

Cooper retired from her position as president in 1940, but she continued her involvement with the university, taking a position as its registrar.

=== 1941–1964 ===
Adolphus A. Birch, an Episcopal priest, succeeded Cooper as president after her retirement in 1940. Throughout the 1940s, the university experienced a significant decline, with its final appeal for accreditation being denied in 1943. Community-service education also declined in popularity during this period, making it difficult to find volunteers, and prospective students were less interested in the social and moral focus the school provided. The final closure date of Frelinghuysen University is unclear, with sources disagreeing on the specifics. Catherine Finn, writing for the DCist places the closure in the late 1950s, Melinda Chateauvert states in The Third Step that the school closed in 1960, while Karen Johnson, in In Service for the Common Good, ties the school's final closure to Cooper's death in 1964.

== Campus ==
Upon opening in 1906, the first classes were taught in the Lawsons' home at 2011 Vermont Avenue. Until 1921, when the university purchased its first building, it used a "home college" system, where classes were exclusively held in homes and businesses in the area.

Frelinghuysen University's first permanent building was located at 1800 Vermont Avenue in the Shaw neighborhood of Northwest Washington, D.C. Purchased in 1921, the building was used for classrooms until 1927. Diller B. Groff built the house in 1879, and it was first inhabited by insurance agent Edwin P. Goodwin and his family. A two-story structure of red brick, the Queen Anne style home had a triangular floor plan with an octagonal corner tower. The university's use of this location was significant for demonstrating the social change in the neighborhood, as it transitioned from speculative housing for middle-class White residents to a leading neighborhood for African-American residents. The building was listed on the National Register of Historic Places in 1995 for significance in the area of African American education, and it is also part of the Greater U Street Historic District. Today, the building is listed on the Washington D.C. African American Heritage Trail.

In 1927, needing to expand its dedicated class space, the university sold its first building and purchased a larger property at 601 M Street. Formerly a home for the elderly, managed by the Methodist Episcopal Church, the property included three buildings with sixty-six rooms and a large lawn. Initial plans were to use the largest building, with thirty-eight rooms, for lecture halls and offices, with the smallest building housing workshops for industrial education. There would be dormitories in the third building and the largest building. The university could not make payments consistently and fell into arrears, and the property was foreclosed on in 1931. Following the foreclosure, Cooper donated the use of six rooms of her home at 201 T Street to Frelinghuysen University to be used as a library and classrooms.

== Academics and activism ==
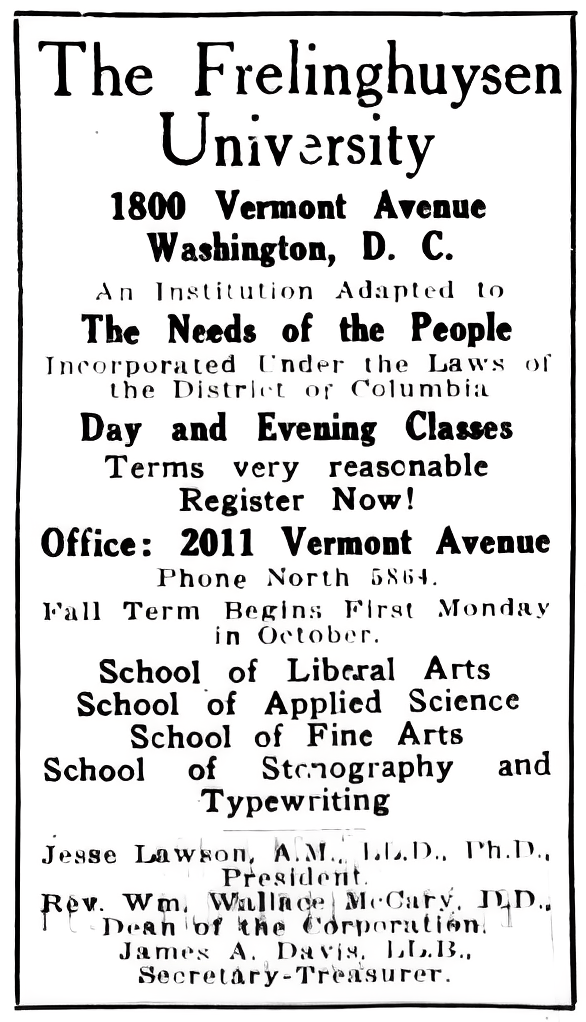
A newspaper ad for Frelinghuysen University, published in The Washington Herald in 1922

Frelinghuysen University offered a broad range of adult educational programs for non-traditional students and working-class African Americans, including courses for those with limited or no literacy skills. The university's offerings included a complete high school curriculum and courses at the undergraduate and graduate levels. Courses were also provided for trades and both semi-professional and professional occupations. Often, vocational education and higher education were provided in complement to each other to match the capacity of the student. The student body was made up mostly of men who were long-time residents of Washington, D.C., generally from working-class, uneducated families. The evening classes, while making attendance more accessible for those who worked a trade during the day, could be difficult for women due to their family and work responsibilities. Coursework for women was focused on general education rather than vocational training to help shape the impression of African Americans that their employers would form and aiming to create an expectation of professionalism for domestic workers that would push wages higher and increase respect for the occupation.

The university included schools of liberal arts, applied science, biology, sociology, theology, law, chiropractic, pharmacy, embalming and sanitary science, and commerce. Graduates of the John M. Langston School of Law often went on to work in the Treasury Department or the General Printing Office, and in 1927, an article in the Pittsburgh Courier reported that over 75 percent of graduates of the university's law school went on to pass the Washington, D.C., bar exam.

The Hannah Stanley Opportunity School at Frelinghuysen University, named after Cooper's mother, provided a general education course to prepare students for community service. The university also offered home nursing classes, supported by the Washington, D.C., chapter of the Red Cross. Colored American Forward was founded at the university in 1917, with its members working to aid and protect the large number of African Americans leaving the southern United States for northern and western states during the Great Migration.

== Notable people ==
=== Alumni ===
- Rosetta Lawson (chiropractic science) eductor, temperance activist, co-founder of Frelinghuysen University
- A. Langston Taylor (law), founder and first national president of Phi Beta Sigma; civil rights and labor activist

=== Faculty ===
- Anna J. Cooper, author and educator; second president of Frelinghuysen University
- Jesse Lawson, founding president of Frelinghuysen University
- Rosetta Lawson, teacher of anatomy and physiology; co-founder of Frelinghuysen University
- Gertrude P. McBrown; English teacher and poet
