= Frances Noyes Hart =

American writer

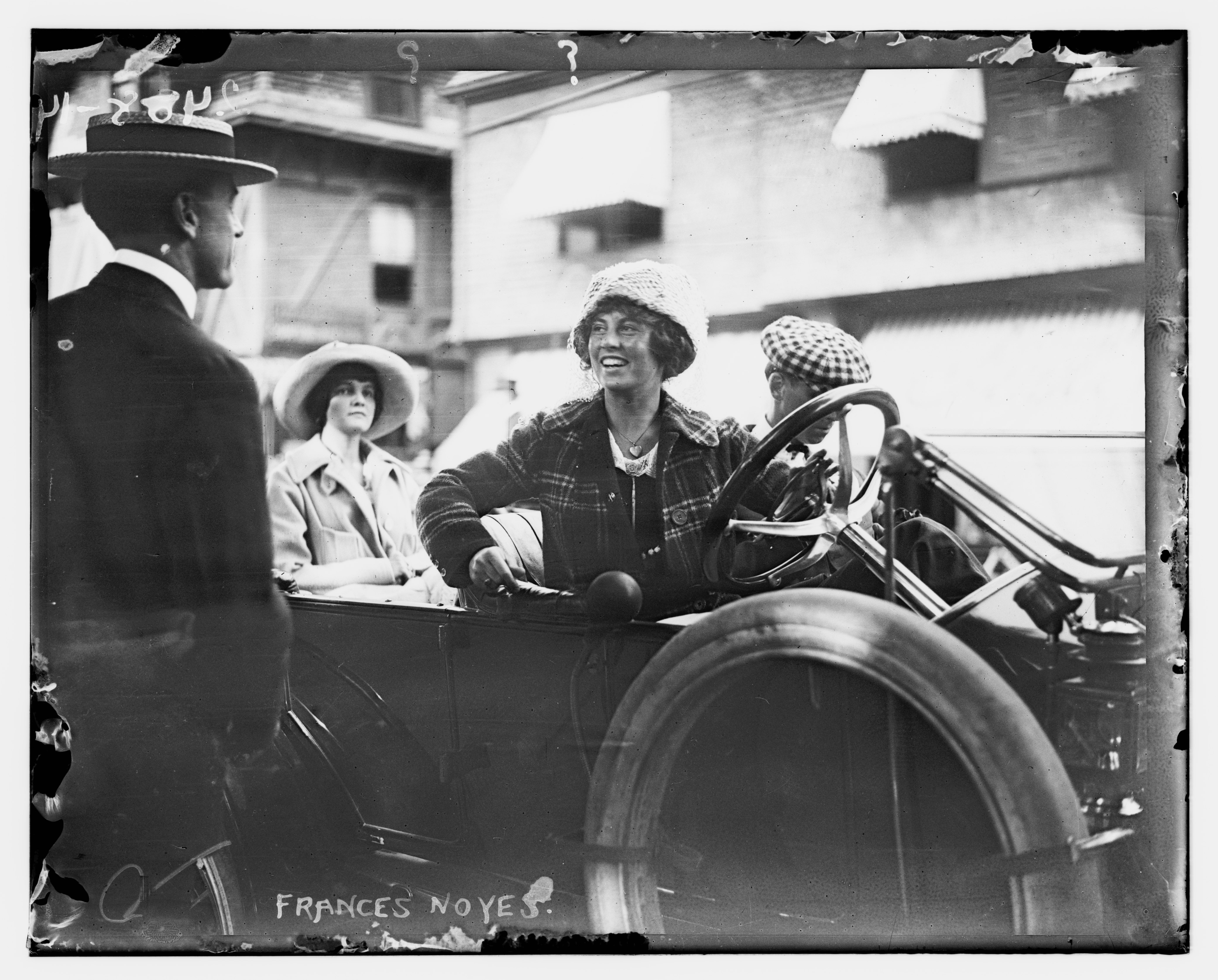
- circa 1913
- Born: Frances Newbold Noyes; August 1, 1890; Washington, DC
- Died: October 25, 1943 (aged 53); New York City
- Spouse: Edward H. Hart
- Children: Ann Hart Thayer, Janet Hart Golden
- Parent: Frank Brett Noyes
- Relatives: Crosby Stuart Noyes (grandfather)
- Awards: Grand Prix de Littérature Policière

Frances Newbold Noyes Hart (August 1890 – October 25, 1943) was an American writer whose short stories were published in Scribner's magazine, the Saturday Evening Post, and the Ladies' Home Journal.

== Biography ==
She was born as Frances Newbold Noyes on August 10, 1890 to Frank Brett Noyes and Janet Thurston Newbold. During World War I, she served as a translator with the Navy and as a canteen worker in France (see her book My AEF: A Hail and Farewell). She married lawyer Edward H. Hart in 1921. She died in 1943.

In 1948, Noyes' book The Bellamy Trial won the Grand Prix de Littérature Policière International Prize, the most prestigious award for crime and detective fiction in France.

== Publications ==
- Mark (1913)
- My A.E.F.--A Hail and Farewell (1920)
- "Contact" – Pictorial Review, December 1920 (second prize, O Henry Award, 1920). Repr. Contact and Other Stories (1923)
- The Bellamy Trial (1927) – Included on the Haycraft-Queen Cornerstone List
- Hide in the Dark (1929)
- Pigs in Clover (1931)
- (with Frank E. Carstarphen) "The Bellamy Trial: A Play in Three Acts" (1931)
- The Crooked Lane (1934)
