= Crosby Stuart Noyes =

American publisher

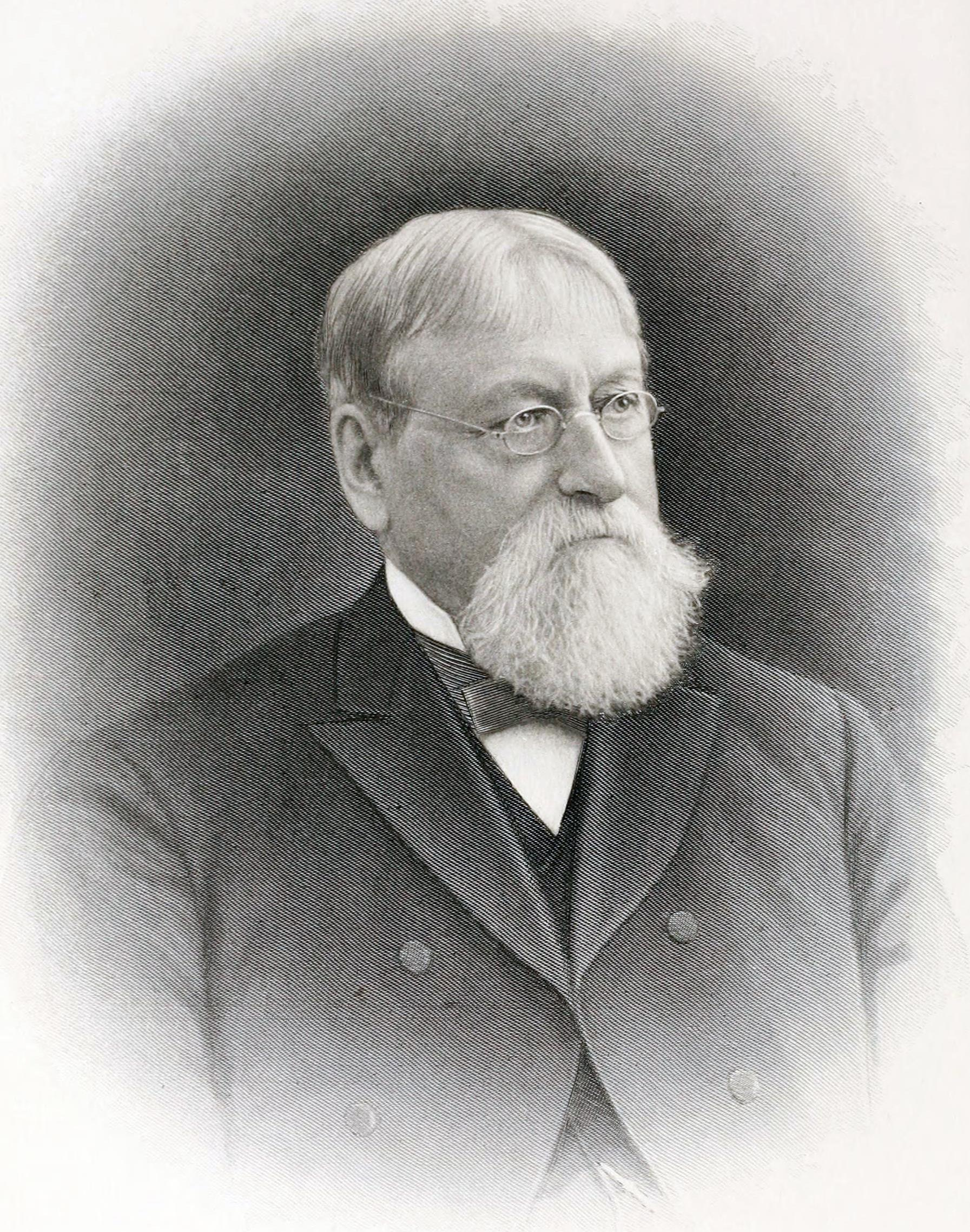
- Born: February 16, 1825; Minot, Maine, US
- Died: February 21, 1908 (aged 85); Pasadena, California, US
- Employer: Washington Evening Star
- Spouse: Elizabeth Selina Williams (m. 1856)
- Children: Theodore W. Noyes; Frank Brett Noyes; Thomas Clarence Noyes

Crosby Stuart Noyes (February 16, 1825 – February 21, 1908) was the publisher of the Washington Evening Star.

== Biography ==
Noyes was born on February 16, 1825, in Minot, Maine. Interested in writing from childhood, he published a juvenile newspaper called the Minot Notion when he was fifteen. Later, Maine newspapers began to publish his humorous sketches. One such sketch, a dialect-heavy piece titled "A Yankee in a Cotton Factory" was widely republished.

Having arranged to write letters from Washington, D.C., for several New England newspapers, he set out for the nation's capital in 1847. In Baltimore, his funds ran too low to afford onward train fare, so he walked the rest of the way to Washington. In D.C., he worked for a bookseller, as an usher in a theatre, and as a route agent for The Baltimore Sun before becoming a writer for a local weekly, the Washington News. He also added newspapers in Philadelphia as a client for his letter dispatches, and became part of the press gallery that covered the United States Congress.

In 1855, he traveled around Europe on foot, contributing letters to the Boston Transcript. He returned to Washington later that year and became a reporter for the Evening Star, a three-year-old newspaper managed by William Douglas Wallach.

Circulation increased in the decade before the American Civil War and Noyes developed contacts with the Lincoln administration's cabinet such that the Star became an outlet for official announcements. He eventually rose to the position of assistant editor. In 1863, he served on the Washington, D.C., city council and for a couple of terms as an alderman.

In 1867, he and two other investors purchased the Star from Wallach for $110,000 ($2,500,000 today). Appointing himself editor-in-chief, Noyes used his newspaper to crusade to improve Washington's buildings and infrastructure, encouraging the efforts of Alexander Robey Shepherd. He was active in the establishment of Rock Creek Park.

In 1893, Noyes and Brainard Warner, an early developer of Kensington, Maryland, built and stocked what became the first public library in the D.C. area, now known as the Noyes Children's Library in Kensington.

He died on February 21, 1908, in Pasadena, California.

== Personal life ==
He married Elizabeth S. Williams in 1856. They had five surviving children, Theodore Williams, Frank Brett, Thomas Clarence, Maud Noyes Hall and Miranda "Myra" Cushman Noyes. Theodore was an associate editor at the Evening Star and Frank was the treasurer and business manager.

== Legacy ==
Crosby S. Noyes Education Campus, a public school in Washington, D.C., was named in his honor. Two residential streets — Noyes Drive and Crosby Road — carry his name in the Woodside Park neighborhood of Silver Spring, Maryland. The entire neighborhood was developed from his country estate, known as Alton Farm. Mount Noyes in Washington state is named in his honor.
