= William Douglas Wallach =

American journalist (1812–1871)

William Douglas Wallach (1812 – December 1, 1871) was an American surveyor and newspaper entrepreneur. Born in Washington, D.C., he earned a civil engineering degree at Columbian College and moved west doing survey work, reaching the Republic of Texas in 1838 where he supported Sam Houston and the annexation of Texas to the U.S.

In 1839 he was editor of the Matagorda Bulletin and purchased the Matagorda Colorado Gazette and Advertiser the following year, which printed until 1843. He returned to Washington in 1845 and joined the staff of the Washington Union. In 1853 he purchased a stake in the Washington Daily Evening Star, becoming its sole owner in 1855. He guided it to become one of the city's leading newspapers until 1867, when he sold his interests in the Star to the Noyes, Kauffman, and Adams families.

Wallach died on December 1, 1871, at his home in Montrose, Virginia.

His middle name Douglas can also be found spelled with 2 "s": Douglass. The Scottish spelling came from his mother and grandmother's family and he was called "Doug". Most online sources have one "s".
