= Burwell =

Burwell may refer to:

== People ==
- Burwell (name)

== Places ==
- Burwell, Cambridgeshire
- Burwell, Lincolnshire
- Burwell, Nebraska
- Burwell Creek, a stream in Georgia
- The Burwell, an NRHP-listed high-rise in Knoxville, Tennessee

== Ships ==
- USS Laub (DD-263), a destroyer renamed HMS Burwell when she was transferred to the Royal Navy in World War II

== Government ==
- Sylvia Mathews Burwell (born 1965), United States Secretary of Health and Human Services, who due to that role, has been named as the defendant in several related lawsuits:
  - Burwell v. Hobby Lobby
  - King v. Burwell
  - Zubik v. Burwell
