= Black Fashion Museum =

Former museum in Harlem and Washington, D.C.

The Black Fashion Museum is a former museum that traced the historical contributions of black designers and clothing makers to fashion. Originally established in Harlem in 1979 by Lois K. Alexander Lane, and relocated to Washington, D.C. in 1994, the museum operated until 2007, when the Black Fashion Museum Collection was accepted into the collections of the National Museum of African American History and Culture.

== History ==
In 1963, Lois K. Alexander Lane was working on her master's thesis focused on the role of African Americans in the retail industry. This led her on a path to research and collect black fashion memorabilia throughout the country.

The museum was established in Harlem in 1966 by Alexander Lane as a means of telling African American history through fashion. The museum was an affiliate of the Harlem Institute of Fashion. Alexander Lane eventually received a $20,000 grant from the National Endowment for the Arts to develop the Black Fashion Museum's collection. On October 21st, 1979, the museum moved to a Harlem brownstone on 155 West 126th street (between Adam Clayton Powell Jr. Boulevard and Lenox Avenue). The Civil Court judge Bruce M. Wright cut the inaugural ribbon.

Upon its move to Washington DC, the museum was located in a two-story row house on Vermont Avenue and faced increasing pressure due to the economy and potential damage to the collection from the lack of a museum quality HVAC system. In 2007, Alexander-Lane's daughter, Joyce Bailey, donated the Black Fashion Museum's entire holdings to the National Museum of African American History and Culture.

== Collection ==
Its collection comprised more than 700 garments, 300 accessories, and 60 boxes of archival material collected by Lois K. Alexander Lane throughout her life. Examples are:

- Replicas of ballgowns created by Elizabeth Keckley, the once-enslaved dressmaker who became confidante to Mary Todd Lincoln.
- Clothing and bonnets worn by slaves in the mid-1800s
- Elaborately constructed opera cape made by a former slave
- Beige-patterned skirt worn by an enslaved child in Leesburg, Va.
- Gowns by Ann Lowe, a pioneering African American designer whose patrons included the Rockefellers, the Du Ponts, the Vanderbilts, and Jacqueline Bouvier Kennedy, for whom she designed her wedding dress for her marriage to John F. Kennedy.
- Dress sewn by Rosa Parks shortly before her famous arrest in Montgomery, Ala.
- The original Tin Man costume designed by Geoffrey Holder for the 1975 Broadway musical The Wiz.
