= Burwell (name) =

Burwell is both a surname and a masculine given name. Notable people with the name include:

Surname:

- Alan Burwell (born 1943), English rugby league player
- Armistead Burwell (planter), American planter
- Bill Burwell (1895–1973), American baseball player
- Bryan Burwell (1955–2014), American sportswriter
- Carter Burwell (born 1955), American film score composer
- Cliff Burwell (1898–1977) American pianist and songwriter
- Dick Burwell (1940–2023), American baseball player
- Guy Burwell (born 1965), American illustrator
- Jim Burwell (1898–1974), Alcoholics Anonymous founding member
- Leonidas Burwell (1817–1879), Canadian businessman and politician
- Lilian Thomas Burwell (born 1927), American artist
- Lois Burwell (born 1960), British makeup artist
- Mahlon Burwell (1783–1846), Canadian politician
- Paul Burwell (1949–2007), English musician
- Sylvia Mathews Burwell (born 1965), American businesswoman and 22nd U.S. Secretary of Health and Human Services
- William A. Burwell (1780–1821), American politician
- James F.A. Burwell (born 1999), British, Geographer

Given name:

- Burwell Bassett (1764–1841), American politician
- Burwell B. Bell III (born 1947), United States Army general
- Burwell Jones (1933–2021), American swimmer
- Burwell Boykin Lewis (1838–1885), American politician
- Burwell C. Ritter (1810–1880), American politician
