= Armistead Burwell =

Armistead Burwell may refer to:

- Armistead Burwell (planter) (1777–1841), lived in the early 19th century in Dinwiddie County, Virginia as a planter
- Armistead Burwell (burgess) (1703–1754), member of the Virginia House of Burgesses from Williamsburg 1753–1754
- Armistead Burwell (judge) (1839–1913), associate justice of the North Carolina Supreme Court from 1892 to 1894
- Armistead Burwell Smith IV (born 1970), American composer and multi-instrumentalist
- Armistead Ravenscroft Burwell, a descendant of the prominent Burwell family of Virginia
- Armistead Burwell (delegate) (1770–1820), member of the Virginia House of Delegates from Mecklenburg County, Virginia 1815–1818
