= Rosemary Reed Miller =

American fashion designer (1939–2017)

- Born: Rosemary Reed Miller; June 22, 1939; Yeadon, Pennsylvania, U.S.
- Died: August 2, 2017 (aged 78); Washington, D.C., U.S.
- Education: Temple University
- Occupations: Business owner, historian
- Spouse(s): Paul E. Miller (1935–1974), married until his death
- Partner: John Howard
- Children: Paul "DJ Spooky", Sabrina Miller runs CARE Corozal Animal Rescue Experience in Belize
- Relatives: Mia Miller, Hakeem Ford I, Kerwince Jones II (grandchildren)

Rosemary Reed Miller (June 22, 1939 – August 2, 2017) was the owner of Toast and Strawberries, a landmark boutique in Washington, D.C. She was also a published author on African-American dressmakers from the nineteenth to the twenty-first centuries.

== Biography ==
Rosemary Reed Miller was born in Yeadon, Pennsylvania, the daughter of Byron and Eloise Miller. She graduated from Temple University. She became a press reporter in Jamaica and Puerto Rico. She did freelance work for the Washington Post, Washington Star, Afro-American Newspapers, Miami Herald, and the Amsterdam News.

In the 1960s, Miller was an informational officer for the Department of Agriculture in Washington, D.C. and part-time jewelry accessory designer.

In 1967, Miller opened Toast and Strawberries as a wholesale showroom for various fashion and jewelry designers, and "to pay the bills", transformed the showroom to a retail boutique. The store featured emerging and established designers from around the world. According to Miller, "we felt it was important to show that talent had no limits – male, female, white and black." Clients included singer Aretha Franklin and actress Heather Locklear.

In August 1974, Black Enterprise Magazine profiled Miller in an issue focused on Black Women in Business and Public Life, noting that the D.C. retail operations had generated $190,000 in annual sales in 1973.

Through the years, Miller promoted designers through various community fashion shows. For example, in 1974, Miller participated in the National Council of Negro Women's 8th annual fashion show. In 1979, Toast and Strawberries fashions were showcased before 500 guests at the D.C. chapter of the American War Mothers annual fundraising fashion show. Toast and Strawberries developed a program to educate others about the history of African-American women in dressmaking and designing and to demonstrate how the craft assisted as a venue for economic support and potential independence.

The boutique, which became a local landmark, closed in 2005, in part because of increasing rent. Miller died on August 2, 2017, in her home in Washington D.C.

== Awards ==
- 1981: "Small Business Person of the Year" for Washington, D.C. by the U.S. Small Business Administration.

== Publications ==
- Threads of Time, The Fabric of History: Profiles of African American Dressmakers and Designers, 1850–2002 (features Elizabeth Keckley, Ann Lowe, Zelda Wynn Valdes, Tracy Reese).

== Private life ==
She married the dean of Howard University School of Law Paul Miller, who died suddenly in 1974 at the age of 38. She is the mother of musician and author Paul Miller, known professionally as DJ Spooky. Daughter Sabrina Miller runs CARE Corozal Animal Rescue Experience in Belize, CA. Grandchildren are Mia Miller, Hakeem Ford I, Kerwince Jones II.
