= Lois Lane (disambiguation) =

Lois Lane is a fictional reporter, a comic book character in DC Comics.

Lois Lane may also refer to:

== Television ==
- Lois Lane (Smallville), character in the 2000s TV series Smallville
- Lois Lane (Superman & Lois), character in the TV series Superman & Lois

== Film ==
- Lois Lane (1978 film series character), character in the 1970s and 1980s Superman films
- Lois Lane (DC Extended Universe), character in the DC Extended Universe films

== Literature ==
- Lois Lane, Girl Reporter, a 1940s newspaper comic strip
- Superman's Girl Friend, Lois Lane, first published 1958, a comic book series from DC Comics
- Lois Lane, first published 2015, a young adult novel series by Gwenda Bond

== Theater ==
- Lois Lane, character in the Broadway musical Kiss Me, Kate

== Artist ==
- Lois Lane (artist), an American painter born in 1948
- Lois K. Alexander Lane, (1916 - 2007) American fashion designer, and museum curator

== Music ==
- Lois Lane, born 1944, half of the 1960s British singing duo The Caravelles
- Loïs Lane, founded 1984, a Dutch girl duo Suzanne and Monique Klemann

=== Songs ===
- "Lois Lane", a song by Farrah from the 2001 album Moustache
- "Lois Lane", a song by Sloppy Seconds from the 2008 album Endless Bummer
- "Lois Lane", a song by Franz Ferdinand from the 2018 album Always Ascending

== See also ==
- Origin of the name Lois
- Lois & Clark: The New Adventures of Superman, a 1990s Superman television series
- Superman & Lois, a 2021 Superman television series
- Superman: Lois and Clark, a comic book limited series published in 2015 from DC Comics
- Superman and Lois Lane
- Lois Lane in other media
