= Lois K. Alexander Lane =

American fashion designer (1916–2007)

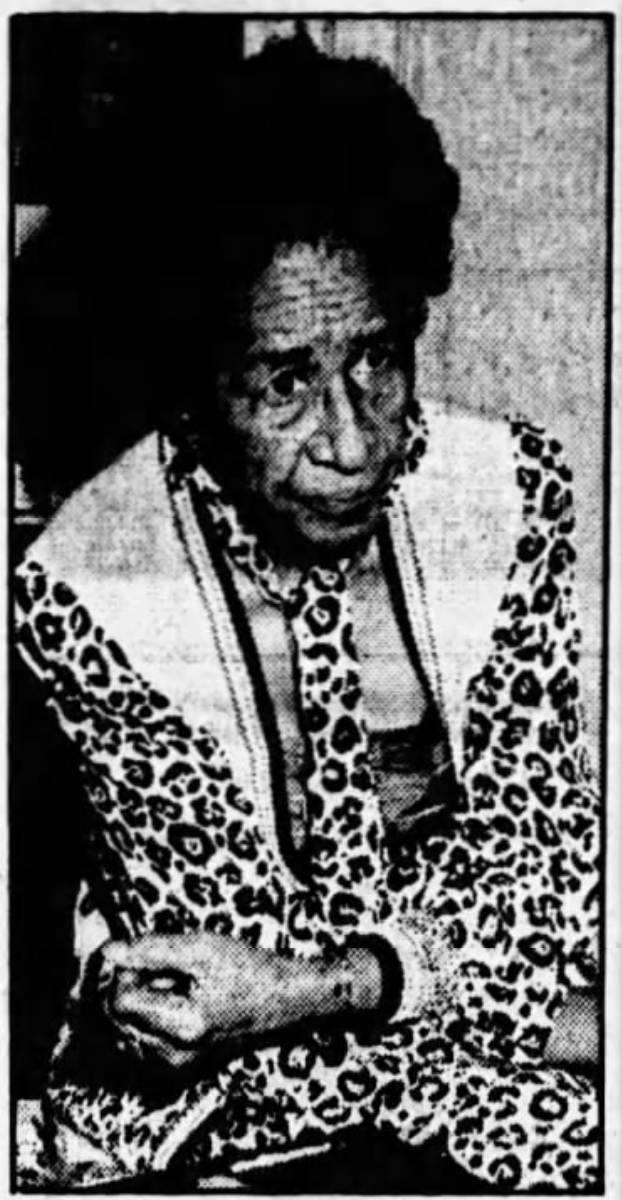
- Born: July 11, 1916; Little Rock, Arkansas, U.S.
- Died: September 29, 2007 (aged 91)
- Occupations: Fashion designer and museum founder

Lois K. Alexander-Lane (born Lois Marie Kindle; July 11, 1916 – September 29, 2007) was an African-American fashion designer who founded the Black Fashion Museum in 1979.

== Early life and education ==
Lois Marie Kindle was born in Little Rock, Arkansas, on July 11, 1916. As a child, Lois and her sister Sammye recreated clothing they had seen at white department stores. Due to her race she was not allowed to enter the stores. Using sketches she drew, Alexander-Lane made clothing for her mother, siblings and dolls with fabric she picked up at the Five & Dime store. She studied at the Hampton Institute and later the University of Chicago. She later married Julius Lane, a former paratrooper.

Alexander-Lane earned her master's degree in fashion and merchandising from New York University in 1963. Her thesis, "The Role of the Negro in Retailing in New York City from 1863 to the Present", was voted best of the year by faculty.

== Career ==
In the 1940s, Alexander-Lane ran a fashion boutique in Washington, D.C. In 1942, she became a clerk-stenographer for the War Department. She later transferred to New York, where she opened another boutique and worked her way to become a Planning and Community Development Officer at the Department of Housing and Urban Development in 1978. In the 1940s, Alexander-Lane started her career path in the federal government, and soon after ran a fashion boutique in Washington D.C. Around this time, she also worked as a freelance photographer for African-American newspapers, and became vice president of the Capital Press Club.

In 1965, she purchased a brownstone in Harlem, New York City, for $8,000. There she founded the Harlem Institute of Fashion in 1966, offering courses in dressmaking, millinery and tailoring. The courses were free with only a $10 registration fee and graduated 4,500 students by 1987. She also founded the National Association of Milliners, Dressmakers and Tailors in 1966.

After leaving the federal government, Alexander-Lane opened the Black Fashion Museum in Harlem in 1979 with a $20,000 grant from the National Endowment of the Arts. The original site in Harlem on West 126th Street now houses the William J. Clinton Foundation. In order to show the long history of Black fashion, Alexander-Lane embarked on a national tour, using the press to help her find garments made by the grandmothers of contemporary designers. With her museum, she sought to counter the notion that Black fashion designers were "new found talent." It was the first collection to highlight African-American fashion designers from throughout the country's history, and Alexander-Lane received little funding and largely funded the museum herself. She had trouble acquiring garments, as many of the designers had worked for wealthy white women, and the majority of the collection consisted of accessories and memorabilia.

The museum relocated to Washington, D.C., in 1994 to a historic row house at 2007 Vermont Avenue NW. The collection comprises about two thousand garments designed, fabricated or worn by African-Americans to tell the story of women and men of the African diaspora. The collection includes garments created by enslaved women; a dress sewn by Rosa Parks shortly before her famous arrest in Montgomery, Alabama; the original costumes designed by Geoffrey Holder for the 1975 Broadway musical The Wiz; and gowns by Ann Lowe, a pioneering African-American designer.

Alexander-Lane designed an extended line of garments, mostly for wealthy sponsors, such as the Rockefeller, Roosevelt, and du Pont families. She was part of the board, and at one time president, of the National Association of Fashion and Accessory Designers. She was part of The National Council of Negro Women, being a charter member.

In 1993, Alexander-Lane received the NAACP's Crusader's Award. She became a show producer for Harlem Week, an exhibition of Harlem fashion, in 1979. In 1992, due to her poverty efforts in New York, Alexander-Lane was given the Josephine Shaw Lowell Award.

Alexander-Lane appeared in a 1980 episode of the game show To Tell the Truth as one of three women claiming to be Rosa Parks.

== Death and legacy ==
Alexander-Lane published a book, Blacks in the History of Fashion, in 1982. She died in 2007 at the age of 91. The Black Fashion Museum collection was donated to the Smithsonian National Museum of African American History and Culture in 2007 by her daughter Joyce Bailey.
