= Wedding dress of Jacqueline Bouvier =

Dress worn by Jacqueline Bouvier at her wedding to John F. Kennedy in 1953

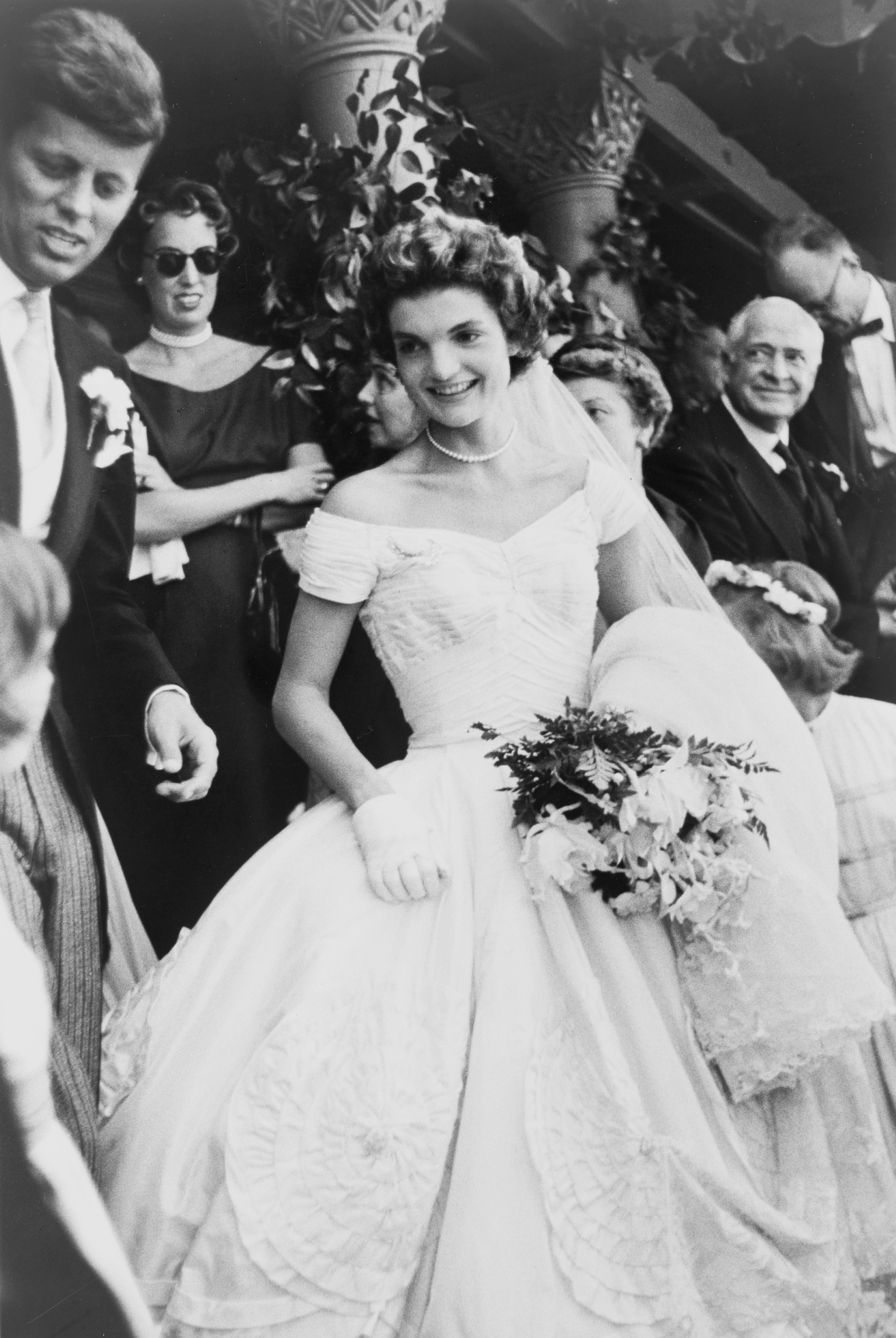
- Jacqueline Bouvier was married to John F. Kennedy in 1953 at St. Mary's Church in Newport, Rhode Island
- Artist: Ann Lowe
- Year: 1953

The wedding dress worn by Jacqueline Kennedy (née Bouvier) for her wedding with John F. Kennedy in 1953 is a bridal gown.

The gown was the creation of African-American fashion designer Ann Lowe, who was not credited as the designer at the time of the wedding. When asked who made her dress, Kennedy said it was a "colored woman".

== Design ==
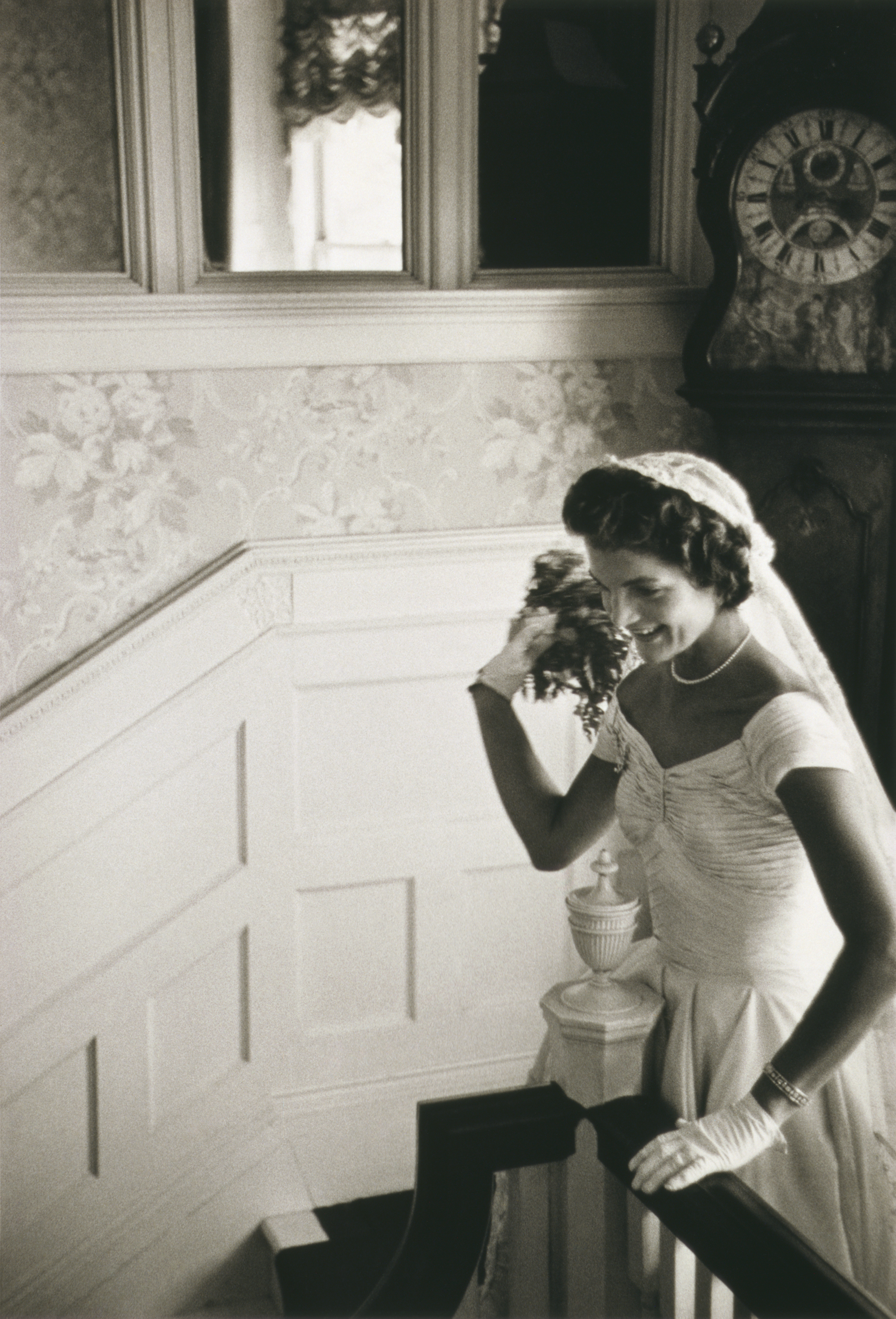
Jacqueline Kennedy throwing the bouquet

Janet Lee Bouvier, Kennedy's mother, hired Lowe to design and make the entire bridal party's outfits. Lowe had made Janet Lee Bouvier's dress for her wedding to Hugh Auchincloss.

The bridal gown, of ivory-colored silk taffeta, featured a portrait neckline and huge round skirt. The skirt featured interwoven tucking bands and tiny wax flowers. Kennedy's lace veil had belonged to her grandmother; a lace-and-orange-blossom tiara tied the veil to her hair. Her bridal bouquet was made of white and pink gardenias and orchids.

Kennedy wore little jewelry with the dress, but what she did wear had personal significance. The single-strand pearl necklace was a family heirloom; she also wore a diamond pin from her parents and diamond bracelet from her groom, John F. Kennedy.

A flood in Lowe's Lexington Avenue workshop 10 days before the wedding ruined the bride's gown and nine of the bridal party's dresses. Ann Lowe and her staff worked through eight days (the original time was eight weeks) to reconstruct the gowns and ensure they were delivered on time. Instead of an estimated $700 profit, Lowe lost $2,200 on the project.

== Reception ==
The dress was crafted in a very traditional design (particularly the skirt) per the wishes of the Kennedy family, and it won worldwide acclaim. However, Jacqueline Kennedy had wanted a simple dress with firm lines to complement her tall, slim figure. She later told friends privately that she did not like the dress's portrait neckline because she felt it emphasized her small bust. She also said that the skirt looked "like a lampshade".

The New York Times' coverage of the wedding described Kennedy's wedding attire in detail, referring to the gown as "a gown of ivory silk taffeta, made with a fitted bodice embellished with interwoven bands of tucking, finished with a portrait neckline, and a bouffant skirt." However, the Times did not name the gown's designer, Ann Lowe. By the mid-1960s, however, Lowe was publicly acknowledged as the designer of the gown.

== See also ==
- List of individual dresses
