= Jim Burwell =

American founding member of Alcoholics Anonymous (1898–1974)

James M. Burwell (March 23, 1898 – September 8, 1974), also known as Jim B., was an American man who was one of Alcoholics Anonymous (AA) founding members. He was among the first ten members of AA on the East Coast, and was responsible for starting Alcoholics Anonymous in Philadelphia and Baltimore. Later in life, he and Rosa, his wife, moved to San Diego, California and were instrumental in the growth of AA there.

James Burwell's Grave

His most crucial contribution at the founding of AA came from his atheism—or as he later termed it, his "militant agnosticism". He argued strongly with the early group in New York that it needed to tone down what he called the "God bit". This resulted in the much more inclusive "Higher Power" and "God as we understand Him" concepts that are now so closely associated with Alcoholics Anonymous.

Although after a relapse, Burwell came to accept the spiritual aspects of Alcoholics Anonymous.

"My brilliant agnosticism vanished, and I saw for the first time that those who really believed, or at least honestly tried to find a Power greater than themselves, were much more composed and contented than I had ever been, and they seemed to have a degree of happiness I had never known."

He was instrumental in the publication of the all-important Saturday Evening Post article by Jack Alexander that first brought nationwide publicity to AA in March 1941. As mentioned by Bill W. in the Twelve Steps and Twelve Traditions (pp. 143 – 145), Jim B. is credited with the adoption of AA's Third Tradition: "The only requirement for A.A. membership is a desire to stop drinking." In the foreword to the first edition of the book "Alcoholics Anonymous", historically prior to the standardization of the 12 Traditions, it is stated that "the only requirement for membership is an honest desire to stop drinking" [emphasis added]. The long form of the Third Tradition now reads:

Our membership ought to include all who suffer from alcoholism. Hence we may refuse none who wish to recover. Nor ought AA membership ever depend on money or conformity. Any two or three alcoholics gathered together for sobriety may call themselves an AA group, provided that, as a group, they have no other affiliation.

According to Clarence Snyder (an early AA member from Cleveland): "Jimmy remained steadfast, throughout his life and 'preached' his particular [non-God] brand of AA wherever he went."

His story, "The Vicious Cycle," was published in the 2nd, 3rd and 4th editions of the AA Big Book.

Burwell is buried in the Christ Episcopal Church cemetery in Owensville, Maryland, near his boyhood friend, John Henry Fitzhugh Mayo, known as "Fitz M.", (AA Big Book Story "Our Southern Friend"). Burwell and Fitz M. were among the first members of AA to get and stay sober with Bill W. in New York.

== See also ==
- Alcoholics Anonymous
- Twelve-step program
- Twelve traditions
- Alcoholism
- Substance dependence
- William Duncan Silkworth

== Literature ==
- Bill W. Alcoholics Anonymous. The Story of How Many Thousands of Men and Women Have Recovered from Alcoholism (4th ed. new and rev. 2001 ed.). New York: Alcoholics Anonymous. ISBN 978-1-893007-16-1. Dewey 362.29 A347 2001. ('Big Book')
- Bill W. (1990). Alcoholics Anonymous Comes Of Age. New York: Alcoholics Anonymous. ISBN 978-0-916856-02-1. LC HV5278.A78A4, Dewey: 178.1 A1c.
- Kurtz, Ernest (1979). Not-God: A History of Alcoholics Anonymous. Center City, Minnesota: Hazelden. ISBN 978-0-89486-065-2. LCCN 79-88264. LC HV5278, Dewey 362.2/9286 or 362.29286 K87 1979.
- Twelve Steps and Twelve Traditions. New York: Alcoholics Anonymous. 1953. ISBN 978-0-916856-01-4.
