= Elizabeth Keckley =

American inventor, activist, professional dressmaker and writer (1818–1907)

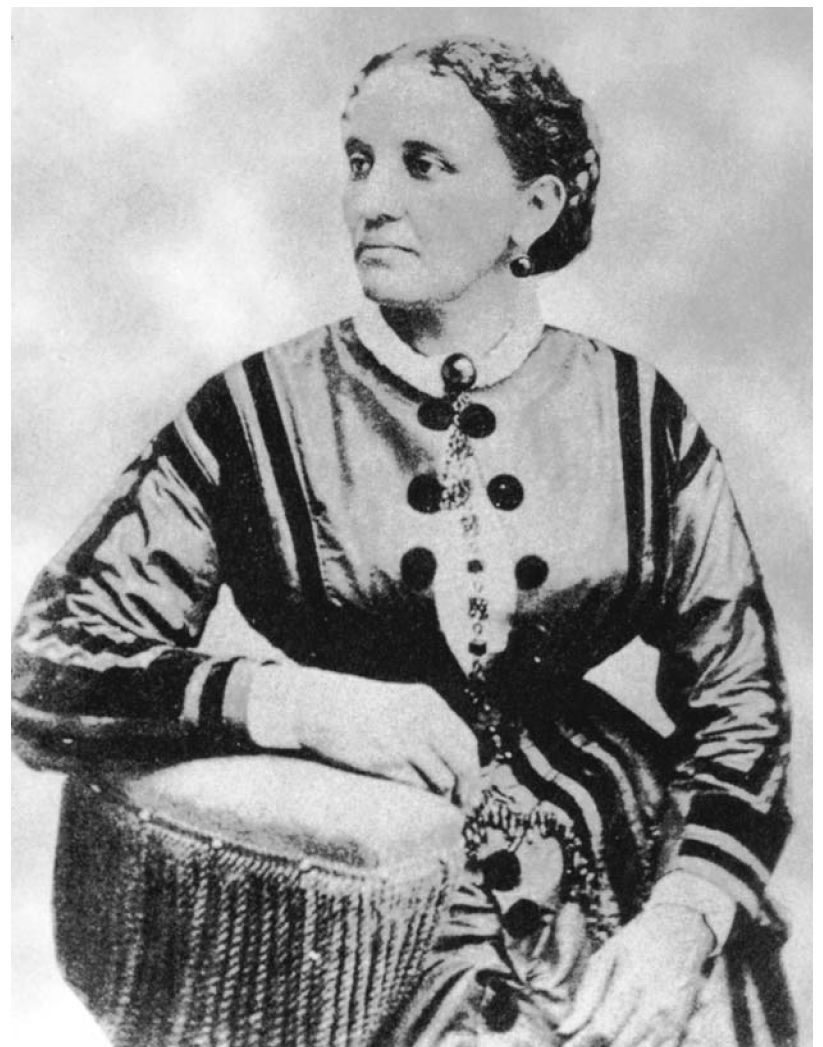
- Keckley in 1870
- Born: February 1818; Dinwiddie County Court House, Dinwiddie, Virginia
- Died: May 1907 (aged 89); Washington, D.C.
- Occupations: Seamstress, Author
- Children: George Kirkland

Elizabeth Hobbs Keckley (February 1818 – May 1907) was an American seamstress, activist, and writer who lived in Washington, D.C. She was the dressmaker (modiste) and confidante of First Lady Mary Todd Lincoln. An African American, Keckley also started the Contraband Relief Association in August 1862, later called the Ladies’ Freedmen and Soldiers’ Relief Association, to help formerly enslaved people and the families of Black soldiers during the Civil War.

Keckley was born enslaved to Armistead Burwell who had also fathered her. Keckley would later be bound to Armistead's daughter Anne Burwell Garland, the wife of Hugh A. Garland. She became a nursemaid to an infant when she was four years old. She received brutal treatment—including being raped and whipped to the point of bleeding welts—from Burwell's family members and a family friend. When she became a seamstress, the Garland family found that it was financially advantageous to have her make clothes for others. The money that she made helped to support the 17 members of the Garland family.

In November 1855, after arranging a loan from some of her sympathetic dressmaking clients, she purchased her and her son's freedom in St. Louis, Missouri. Keckley moved to Washington, D.C., in 1860. She established a dressmaking business that grew to include a staff of 20 seamstresses. Her clients were the wives of elite politicians, including Varina Davis, the wife of Jefferson Davis, and Mary Anna Custis Lee, the wife of Robert E. Lee.

After the American Civil War, Keckley wrote and published an autobiography, Behind the Scenes: Or, Thirty Years a Slave and Four Years in the White House, in 1868. It was both a slave narrative and a portrait of the first family, especially Mary Todd Lincoln, and it was controversial because of information it disclosed about the Lincolns' private lives.

== Slavery ==
=== Early life ===
Elizabeth Keckley (or Keckly) was born into slavery in February 1818, in Dinwiddie County Court House, Dinwiddie, Virginia, just south of Petersburg. She was the only child of her mother Agnes, a light-skinned Black woman whose white ancestors were members of the planter class. Her mother, nicknamed "Aggy", was a "house slave" who had learned to read and write even though it was illegal for enslaved people. She made clothes for 82 people: 12 members of the Burwell family and the 70 people they enslaved. Keckley learned that her father was Armistead Burwell from her mother just before she died. (Note: George Pleasant, who she thought for many years was her father, visited her mother two times a year, the most they were allowed to see each other, and visits stopped entirely when he was sold and taken out of the area.) He permitted Agnes to marry George Pleasant Hobbs, a literate enslaved man who lived and worked at a neighbor's house during Keckley's early childhood. When Hobbs' owner moved far away, Hobbs was separated from Agnes. Although they were never reunited, Agnes and George corresponded for many years. As an adult, Elizabeth Keckley noted "the most precious mementos of my existence are the faded old letters that he wrote, full of love, and always hoping that the future would bring brighter days."

Keckley was enslaved by Burwell, who served as a colonel in the War of 1812, and his wife Mary. She lived in the Burwell house with her mother and began working when she was 4 years old. The Burwells had four children under the age of 10, and Keckley was assigned to be the nursemaid for their infant Elizabeth Margaret. Keckley was harshly punished if she failed to care properly for the baby. One day she accidentally tipped the cradle over too far, causing the infant to roll onto the floor, and Mary Burwell beat her severely. As she grew up, Keckley helped her mother make clothes.

=== Teenage years ===
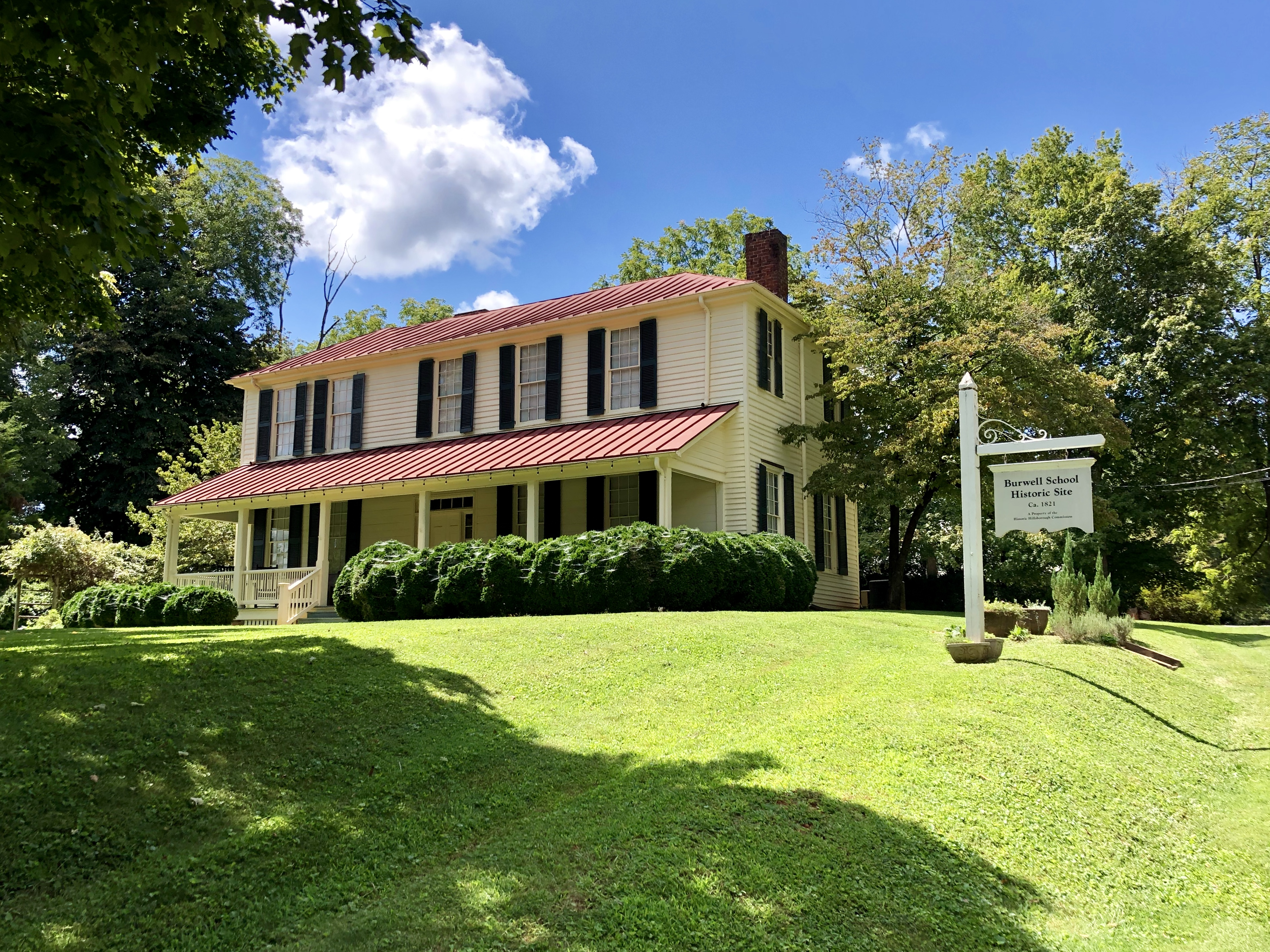
Burwell School, Hillsborough, North Carolina

At the age of 14, in 1832, Keckley was sent "on generous loan" to live with and serve the eldest Burwell son Robert in Chesterfield County, Virginia, near Petersburg, when he married Margaret Anna Robertson. Robert was Elizabeth's half-brother. She was their only servant. The new bride expressed contempt for Keckley, perhaps because her obvious white ancestry made the older woman uneasy; perhaps Keckley resembled Robert. Margaret made home life unpleasant for the young Keckley for the next four years. The family moved to Hillsborough, North Carolina, where Robert was a minister and operated the Burwell School for girls from his house from 1837 to 1857. Keckley stated that Margaret seemed "desirous to wreak vengeance" upon her.

Margaret enlisted neighbor William J. Bingham to help subdue Elizabeth's "stubborn pride". When Keckley was 18, Bingham called her to his quarters and ordered her to undress so that he could beat her. Keckley refused, saying she was fully grown, and "you shall not whip me unless you prove the stronger. Nobody has a right to whip me but my own master, and nobody shall do so if I can prevent it." Bingham bound her hands and beat her, then sent her back to her master with bleeding welts on her back. The next week, Bingham flogged her again until he was exhausted. Again Elizabeth was sent back to her master with bleeding welts upon her back. A week later, Bingham flogged her again until he was exhausted, while she suppressed her tears and cries. The next week, after yet another attempt to "break her", Bingham had a change of heart, "burst[ing] into tears, and declar[ing] that it would be a sin" to beat her anymore. He asked for her forgiveness and said that he would not beat her again. Keckley claims that he kept his word.

When she was 18 years of age, about 1836, Keckley was given to her owner's friend, Alexander M. Kirkland. Also in Hillsborough, he was a prominent white man of the community. He raped Elizabeth for four years of what she called "suffering and deep mortification". In 1839, she bore Kirkland's son and named him George after her stepfather.

For four years, a white man—I will spare the world his name—had base designs upon me. I do not care to dwell upon the subject, for it is one that is fraught with pain. Suffice it to say that he persecuted me for four years, and I ... I became a mother.

— Elizabeth Keckley

=== Adulthood ===
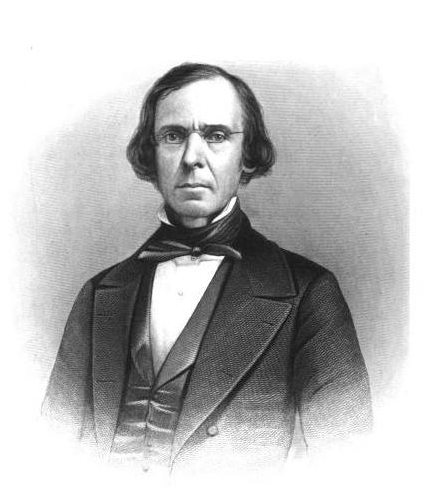
Hugh Alfred Garland (1805–1854)

She was returned to Virginia where she served Mary and Armistead Burwell's daughter, Ann Burwell Garland and her husband, Hugh A. Garland. Ann was her half-sister. The Garlands moved several times and ended up in St. Louis, Missouri, in 1847. Aggy, Elizabeth, and George were taken with them for their child care and sewing skills. Keckley became an accomplished seamstress and, by working long hours, all of the money earned from her labor supported the 17-member Garland family, who suffered significant financial reverses by that time. Nearly 12 years of living and working in St. Louis gave Keckley the chance to mingle with its large free black population. She also established connections with women in the white community, which she later drew on as a free dressmaker.

=== Road to freedom ===
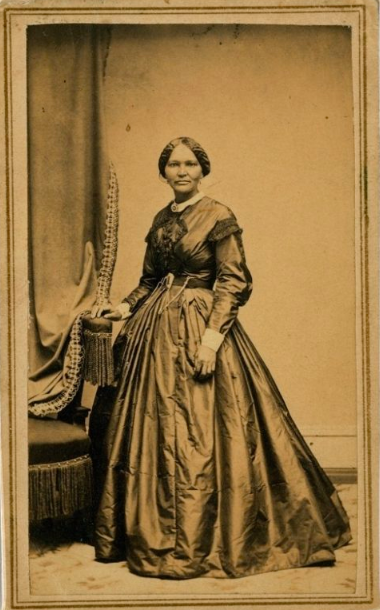
Elizabeth Keckley, 1861, Moorland-Spingarn Research Center, Howard University

Keckley met her future husband James in St. Louis, but refused to marry him until she and her son were free, because she did not want to have another child born into slavery. When she asked Hugh A. Garland to free them and he refused, she worked for two years to persuade him, agreeing to purchase her freedom. In 1852, he agreed to release them for $1,200 (equivalent to $41,464 in 2025). His wife, Anne, put the conditions in writing in 1855. (Note: Keckley considered going to New York to try to "appeal to the benevolence of the people." Elizabeth (Lizzie) Le Bourgeois, said, "It would be a shame to allow you to go North to beg for what we should give you.") Elizabeth "Lizzie" Le Bourgeois, her patron, took up a collection among her friends to loan to Keckley, who was then able to buy her and her son's freedom and was manumitted on November 15, 1855. The papers indicate that she was married to James Keckley by that date. She stayed in St. Louis until she repaid the $1,200 loan, after which she intended to leave St. Louis and James Keckley.

== Career ==
=== Early years ===
In 1860, she enrolled her son, George Kirkland, in the newly established Wilberforce University in Ohio. That year, she moved to Baltimore, Maryland, where she stayed for six weeks. She intended to teach young "colored women" her method of cutting and fitting dresses, but found that she would not be able to earn a sufficient living for herself and her son.

=== Seamstress in Washington ===
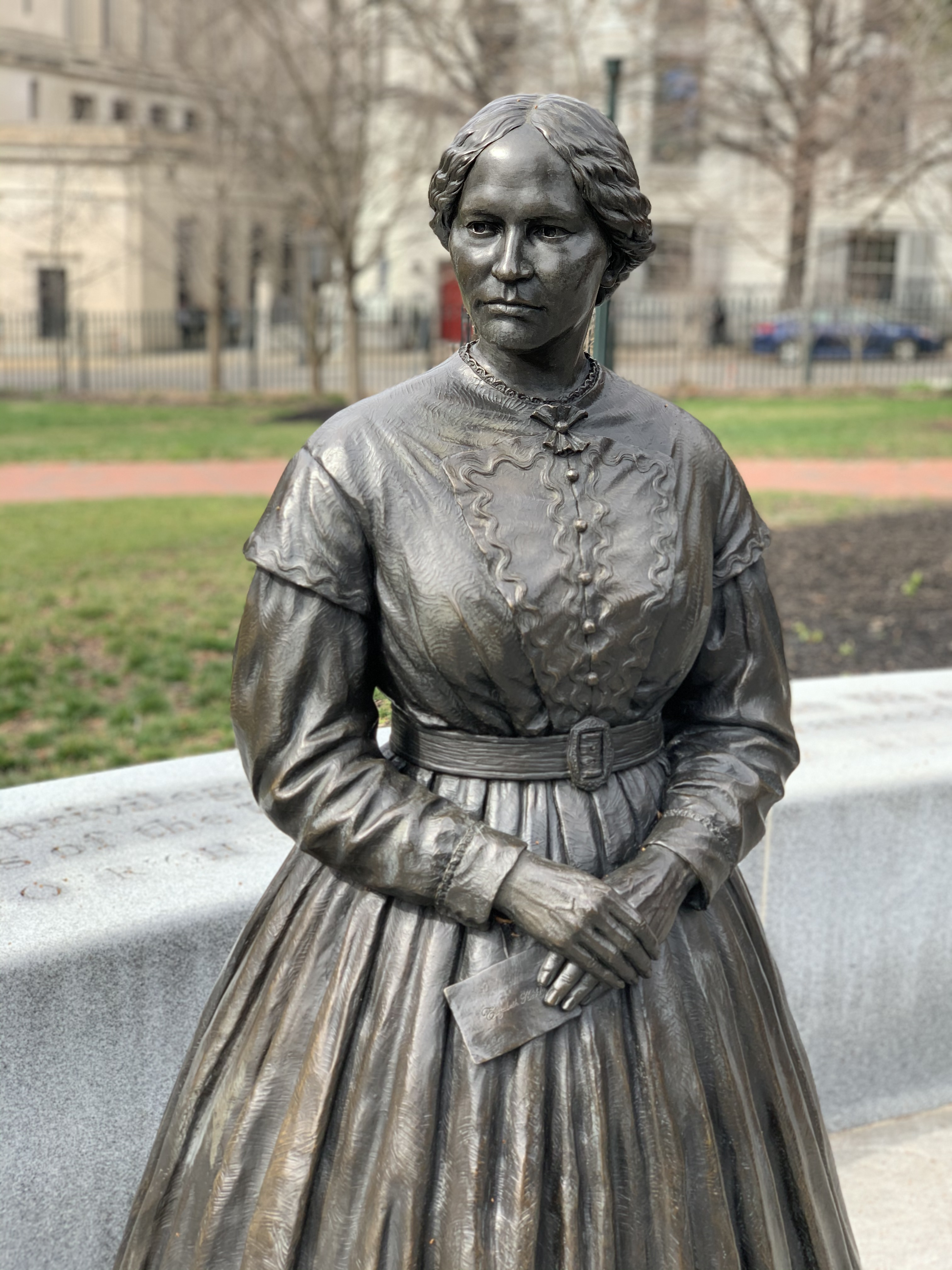
Statue of Elizabeth Keckley included in the Virginia Women's Monument

Keckley planned to work as a seamstress in Washington, but she could not afford the required license for a free black to remain in the city for more than 10 or 30 days. One of her patrons, a woman by the name of Miss Ringold, petitioned Mayor James G. Berret for a license for Keckley, which he granted to her free of charge. Ringold, a member of General John Mason's family from Virginia, also vouched that Keckley was a free woman, another requirement for residence.

Keckley steadily built a client base so that she had enough work to support herself. When she completed a silk dress for Mary Anna Custis Lee, the wife of Robert E. Lee, to wear to a dinner party for the Prince of Wales, the future King Edward VII, Lee was complimented roundly for her dress and Keckley's business grew rapidly. She employed 20 seamstresses at her 12th Street business. It generally took two to three weeks to make each dress. As she began hiring seamstresses to make dresses for her clients, Keckley focused her attention on fitting garments and the seamstresses made most of the garments. She had a talent for draping fabric and fitting garments. The Smithsonian Institution states: "She was known to be the dressmaker in D.C. because her garments had extraordinary fit." Her dresses were considered to be expensive, yet she sometimes made much more money from the commission for manufacture of the fabric than for the actual construction of the article of clothing.

The wife of Stephen A. Douglas, Adele Cutts Douglas, was a client. Keckley later became the favored family seamstress of Varina Davis, the wife of then Senator Jefferson Davis, who with her husband discussed the prospects of war in her presence. She made clothing for Davis and her children. Davis provided an introduction to Margaret McLean of Maryland, a daughter of General Edwin Vose Sumner. Although Keckley said that she was unable to complete an urgent order for a dress due to her established commitments, McLean offered to introduce Keckley to the newly elected president Abraham Lincoln, and his wife. Keckley hired seamstresses to finish the dress for McLean, who arranged a meeting the following week for her with Mary Todd Lincoln.

=== Mary Todd Lincoln ===
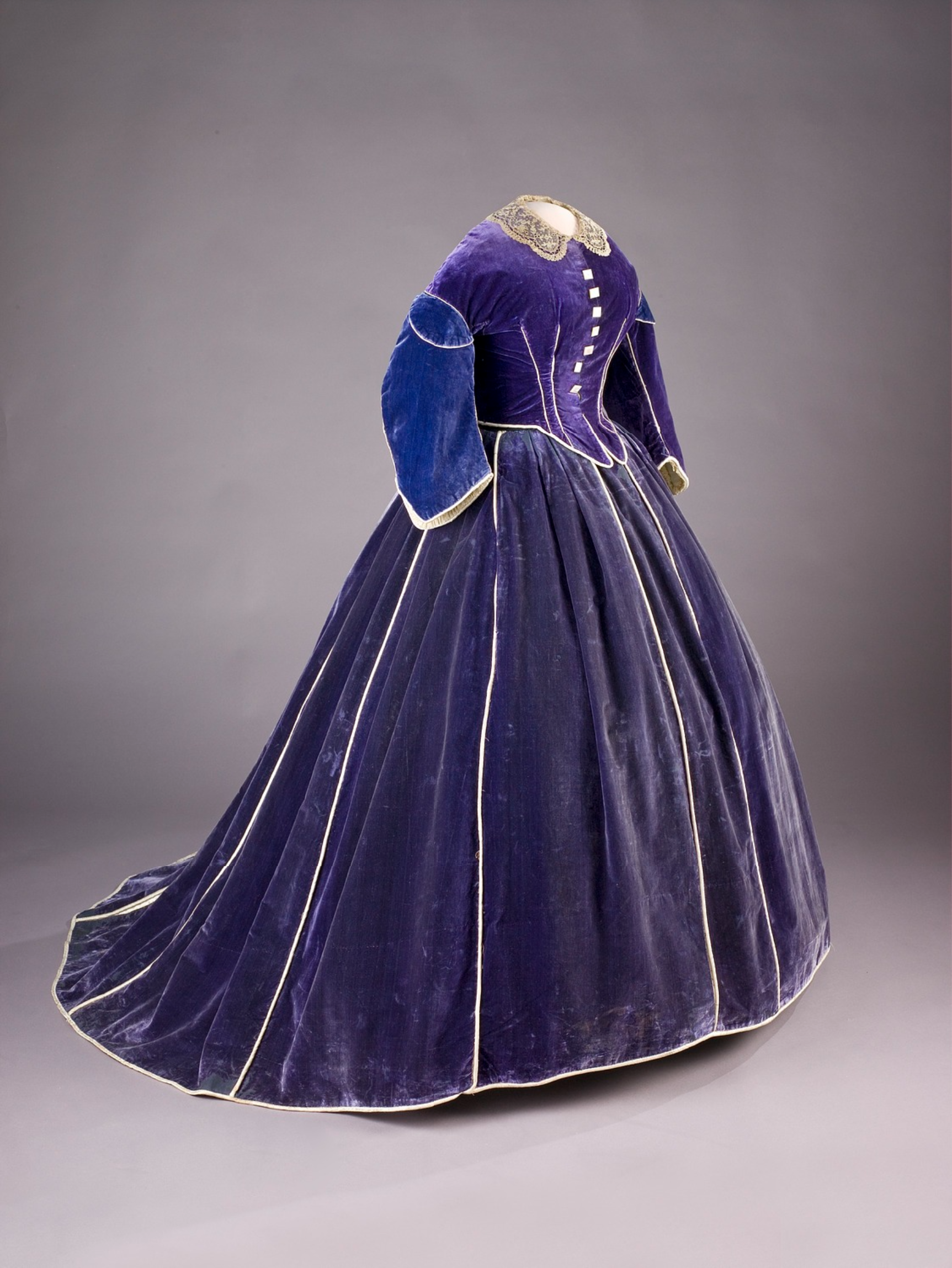
Dress of Mary Lincoln by Elizabeth Keckley, 1861

Keckley met Mary Todd Lincoln on March 4, 1861, the day of Abraham Lincoln's first inauguration and had an interview the following day. Lincoln chose her as her personal modiste and personal dresser, which began when Lincoln was quite upset and overwhelmed about getting ready in time for an event at the White House.

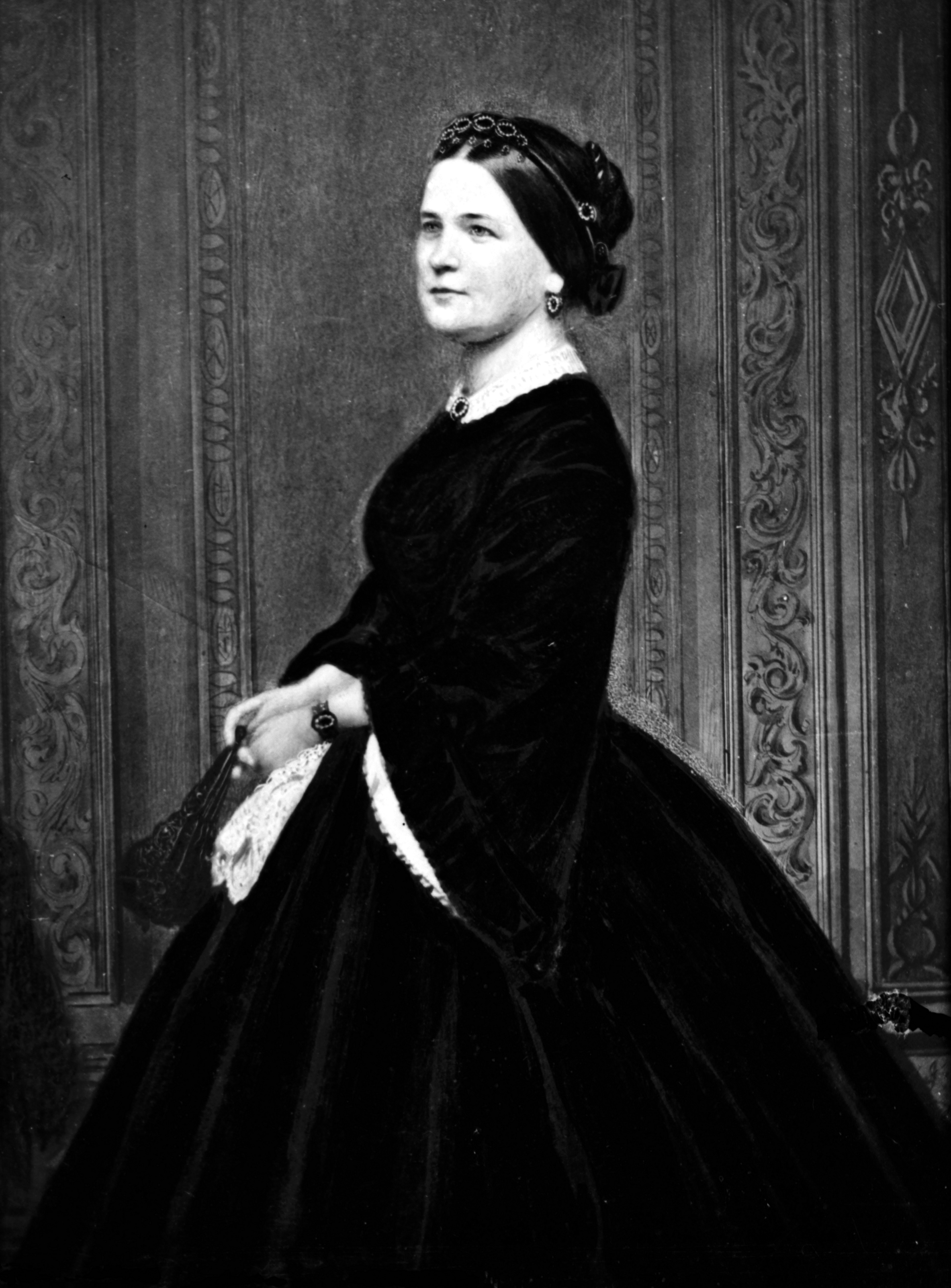
Mary Todd Lincoln, 1860–1865

Keckley made clothing in a simplified style of Victorian fashion, which was sophisticated, with clean lines, and without a lot of ribbon or lace. Lincoln was known for having clothes with floral patterns, bright colors, and youthful styling. The dresses made by Keckley for her were more sophisticated.

There are few extant examples of Keckley's work, partly because people took material from existing dresses to create new ones, and also because there was no labeling or other means to definitively identify clothes as having been made by her. There is a purple velvet gown that Lincoln wore to her husband's second inauguration that is held in the Smithsonian Institution's National Museum of American History. The Chicago History Museum has a buffalo plaid green and white day dress with a cape. A black silk dress with a strawberry motif for strawberry parties may have been made by Keckley; it is located at the Abraham Lincoln Presidential Library and Museum in Illinois.

In 1861, Lincoln went to Mathew Brady's Washington Photography Studio, where she had images taken while wearing an off-the-shoulder dress made by Keckley.

Keckley, who was ladylike and had a regal bearing, became Lincoln's best friend. She often visited the Lincolns' living quarters and was in attendance during private family conversations by 1862. Occasionally, she was asked to help make the president look presentable by fixing his unruly hair. "I loved him for his kind manner towards me," she wrote, for he treated her like "the white people about the house."

In April 1862, the District of Columbia emancipated enslaved persons. Although Keckley had much earlier purchased her own freedom in St. Louis, she was featured in a syndicated newspaper article about previously enslaved people who had made a success of their lives. As there was an influx of previously enslaved people in Washington, she established the Ladies' Freedmen and Soldier's Relief Association to assist people until they were able to establish a life for themselves. The Lincolns assisted her and visited the contrabands camps. Keckley introduced Sojourner Truth to Abraham Lincoln. She was with the Lincolns when they visited Richmond, Virginia, after the end of the Civil War.

She had a calming manner and helped Lincoln navigate during periods of agitation and grief. Keckley, who lost her son during a Civil War battle in August 1861, was a source of strength and comfort for Lincoln after Willie died of typhoid fever in February 1862 and after President Lincoln's assassination. Keckley was among the recipients of Lincoln's effects. She acquired Mary Lincoln's dress from the second inauguration, the blood-spattered cloak and bonnet from the night of the assassination, as well as some of the President's personal items.

Keckley accompanied Lincoln and her children to Illinois after the assassination. In late September 1867, Lincoln was deeply in debt and sought to sell her jewelry and clothing to raise money. Keckley assisted her in disposing of articles of value by accompanying her to New York to find a broker to handle the sales. Although Lincoln used an alias, the fundraising effort became publicly known, and Lincoln was severely criticized for selling clothes and other items associated with her husband's presidency. In the end, the enterprise was a failure; they spent more money than they made.

Elizabeth Keckley donated her Lincoln memorabilia to Wilberforce University for its sale in fundraising to rebuild after a fire in 1865, which upset Lincoln.

=== Behind the Scenes ===
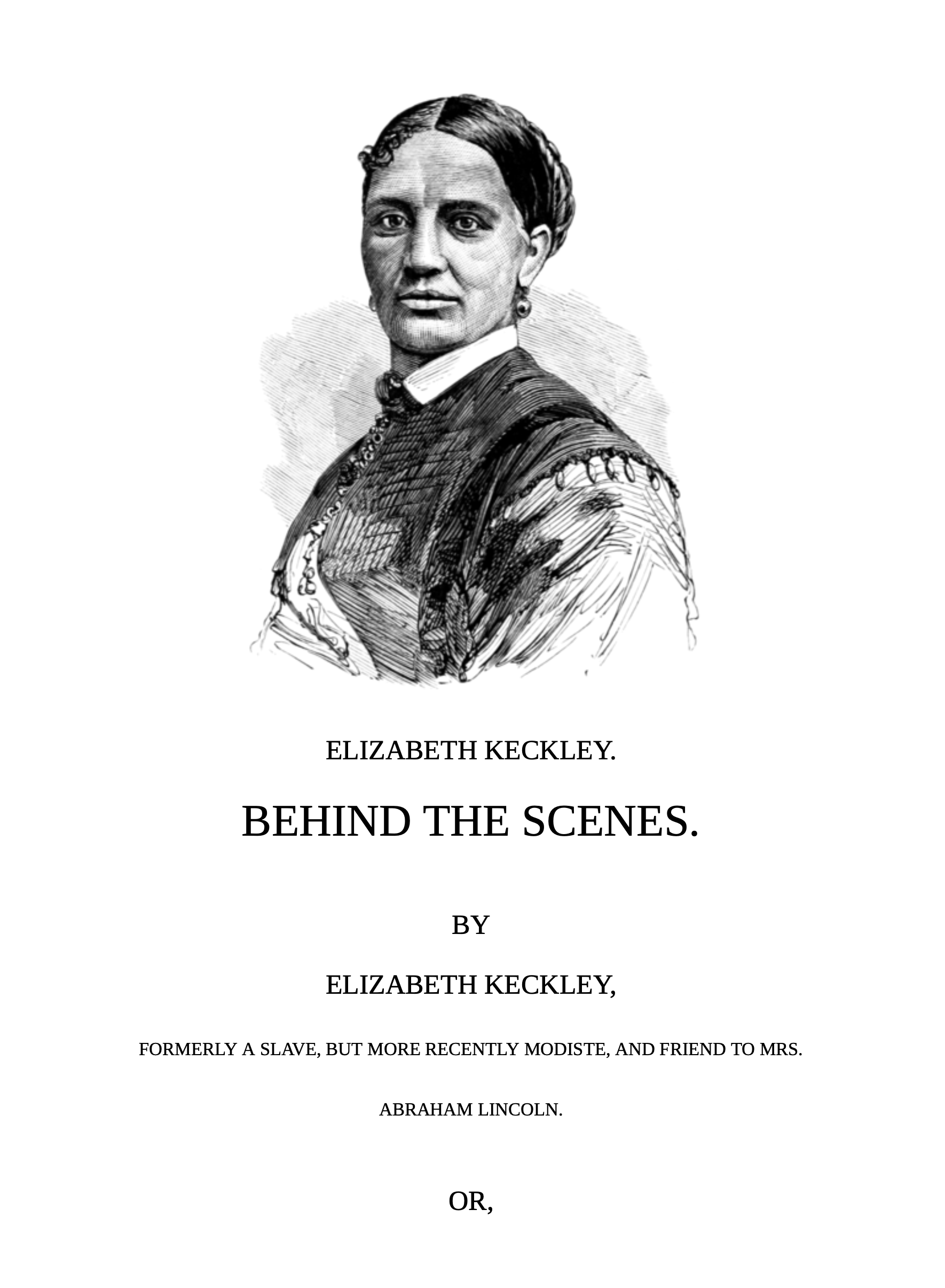
Behind the scenes, or, Thirty years a slave and four years in the White House (1868)

In 1868, Elizabeth Keckley published Behind the Scenes, which told her story of slavery and provided insight into the lives of the Lincolns. Keckley described her own rise from slavery to life as a middle-class businesswoman who employed staff to help complete her projects. She placed herself in the educated, mixed-race middle class of the black community. She emphasized her ability to overcome difficulties and the development of her business sense. While acknowledging the brutalities under slavery and the sexual abuse that led to the birth of her son George, she spent little time on those events. Essentially she "veiled" her own past but, using alternating chapters, contrasted her life with that of Mary Todd Lincoln and "unveiled" the former First Lady, as she noted her debts. Keckley wrote about the Lincolns, in a style of near hagiography for the president, but with a cool, analytical eye for Mary Lincoln. It was written at a time when the public did not have great insight into the lives of the Lincolns, and it particularly shed light on Mary Todd Lincoln. The book portrayed Lincoln as a "loving wife and mother and an ambitious, strong willed, and loyal first lady, while also revealing her to be high tempered, full of fear and anxiety, self-centered and often self-pitying". The editor, James Redpath, included letters from Mary Lincoln to Keckley in the book, and the seamstress was strongly criticized for violating Lincoln's privacy.

By writing the book, it was her intention to improve Mary Lincoln's reputation and to explain what led to Lincoln's old clothes scandal of 1867. She also hoped that the income from the book would provide some financial support for Lincoln. Advertisements labeled the book as a "literary thunderbolt" and the publisher, Carleton & Company, joined in by declaring it as a "great sensational disclosure".

At a time when the white middle class struggled over "genteel performance", Keckley unveiled and revealed a white woman by the very title of her book, showing what went on behind the public scenes and revealing "private, domestic information involving, primarily, white women." (Note: The Lincolns had been subject to criticism as westerners early in his presidency, and Mary Todd Lincoln's anxiety about their position led to her trying to dress right and conduct the White House well. Critics such as Carolyn Sorisio have identified Keckley's unveiling of Lincoln as the reason that the book generated such a backlash. A reviewer from the Cleveland Daily Plain Dealer declared that they were pleased that Keckley's book was published, as it would serve as a warning "to those ladies whose husbands may be elevated to the position of the President of the United States not to put on airs and attempt to appear what their education, their habits of life and social position, and even personal appearance would not warrant.") By writing about Lincoln, Keckley transgressed the law of tact as well as the accepted norms of white supremacy. Her relationship with Lincoln was ambiguous, as it drew both from her work as an employee and from the friendship they developed, which did not meet the rules of gentility and the social separation of races. People felt as if Keckley, an African American and formerly enslaved person, had transgressed the boundaries that the middle class tried to maintain between public and private life.

Jennifer Fleischner writes of the reaction to Keckley's book,

Lizzy's intentions, like the spelling of her name, would thereafter be lost in history. At the age of fifty, she had violated Victorian codes not only of friendship and privacy, but of race, gender, and class.

There was an immediate reaction when the book was published. Keckley has been seen by historians to have lost her friendship with Lincoln while Keckley maintained that it did not ruin their friendship, that the women continued to correspond. She lost many dressmaking clients. Robert Lincoln convinced the publisher to halt production of the book, which he felt was an embarrassment to his family. (Note: Stunned and dismayed by the negative publicity, Keckley wrote letters to newspaper editors and defended her serious intentions, which was part of the model of gentility. The uproar over the book subsided, but it did not sell well. The writer Jennifer Fleischner has suggested that Lincoln's son Robert, who was perpetually embarrassed by his mother's behavior in private life (and would have her committed to an asylum in 1875), did not want the public to know such intimate details as appeared in the memoir.) (Note: Keckley's autobiography prompted controversy and questions about the veracity of her portrayals. In 1935, the journalist David Rankin Barbee wrote that Keckley had neither written her autobiography nor even existed as a person; he asserted the abolitionist writer Jane Swisshelm wrote the slave narrative to advance her abolitionist cause. Many people who read the article challenged his claim, citing personal and/or secondary acquaintance with Keckley. Barbee modified his statement, saying: "no such person as Elizabeth Keckley wrote the celebrated Lincoln book.") The book was published again in the early 1900s. First read for background information about the Lincolns, the book is now primarily appreciated for the narrative of Keckley's life as an enslaved girl and woman.

=== Later years ===
Keckley continued to attempt to earn a modest living until about 1890. In 1892, she was offered a faculty position at Wilberforce University as head of the Department of Sewing and Domestic Science Arts and moved to Ohio. The following year, she held an exhibit at the Chicago World's Fair, representing Wilberforce. Due to a mild stroke, she resigned in 1893.

== Ladies' Freedmen and Soldier's Relief Association ==
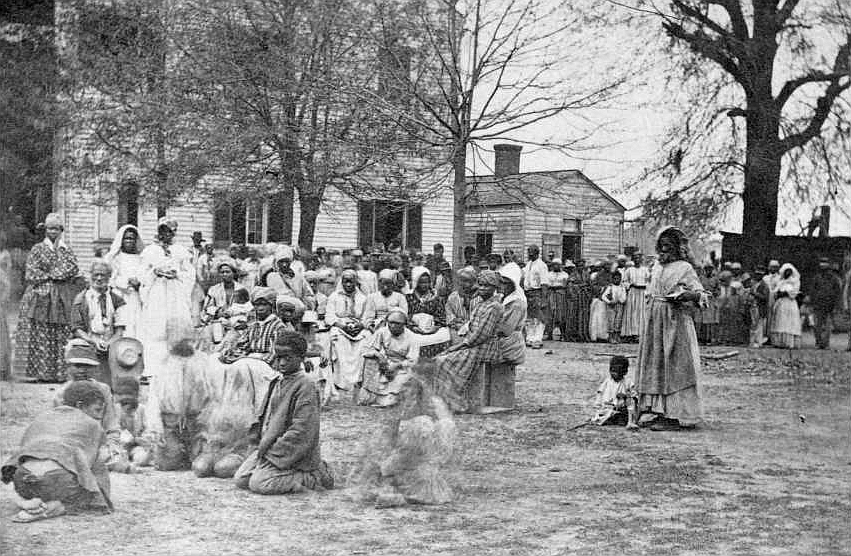
A contraband camp, formerly used as a female seminary, circa 1863

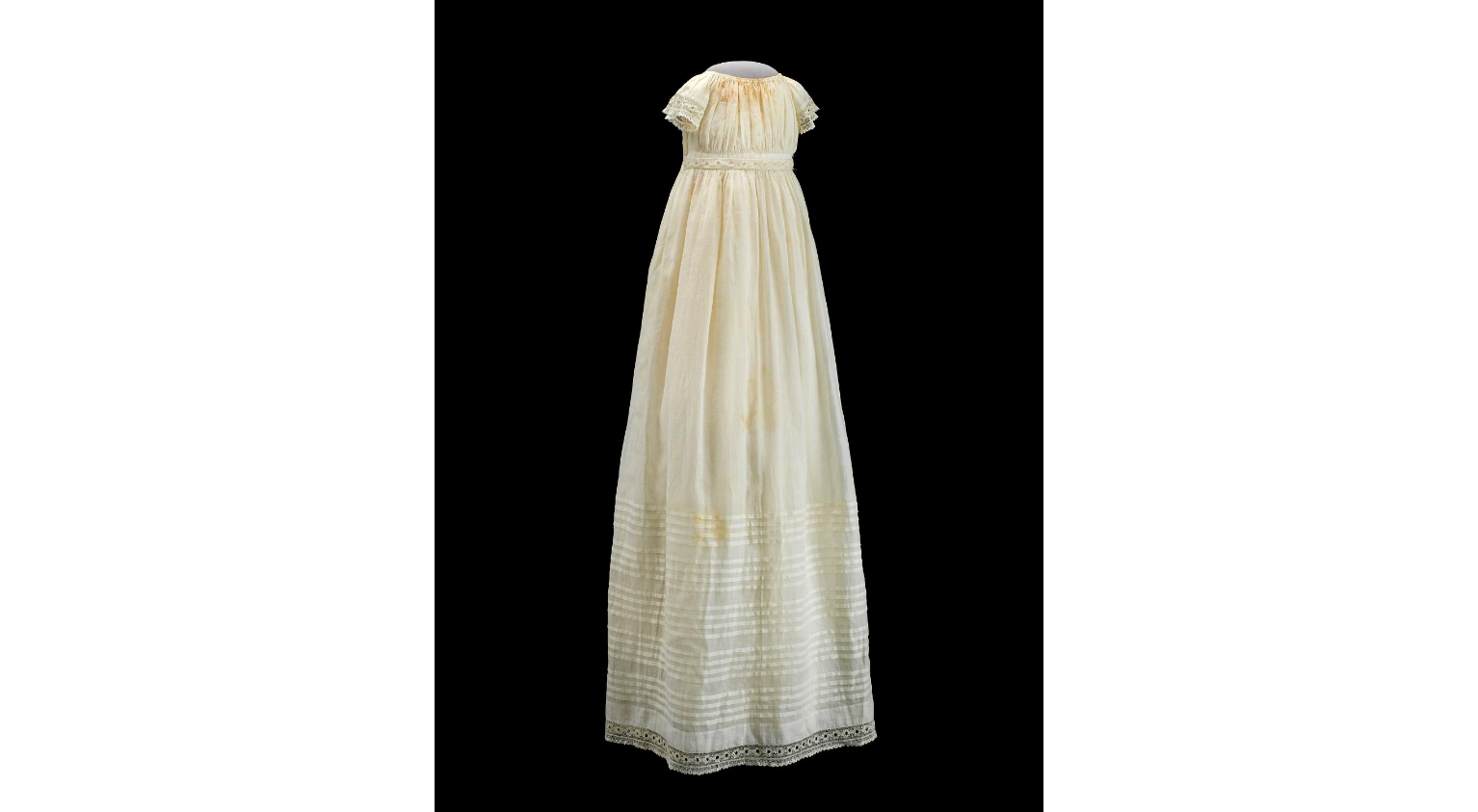
Christening Dress designed by Elizabeth Keckley, worn by goddaughter Alberta Elizabeth Lewis-Savoy in 1866

Keckley founded the Contraband Relief Association in August 1862, receiving donations from both Lincolns, as well as other white patrons and well-to-do free blacks. The organization changed its name in July 1864 to the Ladies' Freedmen and Soldier's Relief Association, to "reflect its expanded mission" after blacks started serving in the United States Colored Troops. The organization provided food, shelter, clothing, and medical care to recently freed persons, who were called contrabands because they were not legally free people and considered seized property, or contrabands, of war.

Keckley wrote about the contrabands in Washington, D.C., in her autobiography. She said that formerly enslaved people were not going to find "flowery paths, days of perpetual sunshine, and bowers hanging with golden fruit" in Washington, D.C., but that "the road was rugged and full of thorns." She saw that "[their] appeal for help too often was answered by cold neglect." One summer evening, Keckley witnessed "a festival given for the benefit of the sick and wounded soldiers in the city," which whites organized. She thought the free blacks could do something similar to benefit the poor and suggested to her colored friends "a society of colored people be formed to labor for the benefit of the unfortunate freedmen."

The association used the independent black churches for meetings and events, such as the Twelfth Baptist Church, Fifteenth Street Presbyterian Church, Israel African Methodist Episcopal Church, and Siloam Presbyterian Church. The organization held fundraisers, with concerts, speeches, dramatic readings, and festivals. Keckley sought out prominent black figures to support the organization including Frederick Douglass, Henry Highland Garnet, J. Sella Martin, as well as prominent white figures such as Wendell Phillips.

Its receipts were "$838.68 the first year and $1,228.43 the second year. 5,150 articles of clothing had been received during that time." It affirmed in its first annual report that "every effort made by us to obtain funds to alleviate in any way the distresses of our afflicted brethren has been crowned with success." Out of the $838.68, approximately $600 was given by and raised by black run and/or predominately black organizations such as the Freedmen's Relief Association of District of Columbia, Fugitive Aid Society of Boston, Waiters of Metropolitan Hotel, and the Young Misses of Baltimore.

The association distributed clothes, food, and shelter among the freedmen and sent funds to many. Jean Fagan Yellin notes that the association sent $50 to the sick and wounded soldiers at Alexandria, Virginia. The association hosted Christmas dinners for sick and wounded soldiers. It distributed food to other organizations. The organization helped to place African-American teachers in the newly built schools for blacks. The entire community had recognized, valued, and thanked "the officers and the members of the Association for their kindness and attentive duties to the sick and wounded;" but it was overlooked in later histories.

The association became lost to history, but it set the standards and showed the need for relief organizations to provide aid to the poor and displaced black community. The work of the association within the black community helped create black autonomy. Through intra-ethnic networking, the association created an organization by and for African Americans.

== Personal life ==
When she lived in St. Louis, Elizabeth became reacquainted with James Keckley, whom she knew in Virginia. He portrayed himself as a free man. Elizabeth and James were allowed to marry by November 15, 1855, and were married for eight years. During that time, she learned that he was still enslaved, was not a helpful partner, relied on her support, and was subject to abuses. She separated from him, and their marriage officially ended with his death, due to his excesses.

The Battle of Wilson's Creek, where Keckley's son George was killed

Keckley's only child, George Kirkland, had a very pale complexion. More than three-quarters white, he enlisted as a white in the Union Army in 1861 after the war broke out. He was a private in the 1st Missouri Infantry Regiment, Company D, led by Captain Richardson. He died on August 10, 1861, during the Battle of Wilson's Creek. After difficulties in establishing her son's racial identity, Keckley gained a pension as his survivor; it was $8 monthly and was later raised to $12 (equivalent to $314 in 2025) for the remainder of her life. After she was unable to work, the pension was her only income.

During the 1860s, she lived at the boardinghouse owned by her friend and her friend's husband, Mr. and Mrs. Walker Lewis, who was a successful caterer or steward. He also bought himself out of slavery. She also had residential rooms at her business on 12th Street. Keckley was present for the birth of one of the daughters, Alberta Elizabeth Lewis. Mrs. Lewis made her godmother of her daughters. Keckley made a christening gown for her infant goddaughter, which is among the collection of the National Museum of American History. After Lewis died, she raised the girls.

Mrs. Keckley was a woman of refinement and culture, always careful of her associates—She carried herself gracefully and well poised and had a striking and pleasing personality.

— Alberta Elizabeth Lewis-Savoy

She was a member of the Union Bethel Church until 1865, when she joined the 15th Street Presbyterian Church in Washington. For a period of time, she lived in Washington, D.C., with John Gray, a successful caterer during the Lincoln administration. By the late 1890s, she returned to Washington, where she lived in the National Home for Destitute Colored Women and Children, which she helped found. While there, she was noted for her cultured and polished manner and for her intelligence. She was also very reserved.

In May 1907, Keckley died as a resident of the National Home, located on Euclid St. NW, in Washington, D.C. She was interred at Columbian Harmony Cemetery. In 1960, her remains were transferred to National Harmony Memorial Park in Landover, Maryland, when Columbian Harmony closed and the land was sold. A historic plaque installed across the street from the site of the former home commemorates her life. Jennifer Fleischer wrote:

Perhaps the most poignant illustration of the different fates of these two women is found in their final resting places. While Mary Lincoln lies buried in Springfield in a vault with her husband and sons, Elizabeth Keckley's remains have disappeared. In the 1960s, a developer paved over the Harmony Cemetery in Washington where Lizzy was buried, and when the graves were moved to a new cemetery, her unclaimed remains were placed in an unmarked grave—like those of her mother, stepfather, and son.

On May 26, 2010, 103 years after her death, a marker was placed at Keckley's grave in National Harmony Memorial Park. (Note: A two-year search for the location of her remains then required donations of $5,000 to place a marker, since Keckley had no living relatives. Funds were contributed by "National Harmony Memorial Park; The Surratt Society; Black Women United For Action, a Virginia-based organization that works to improve the lives of women; The Lincoln Forum, a national organization that works to learn about and preserve the memory of Abraham Lincoln and the Civil War; and the Ford's Theatre Society.")

== Legacy and honors ==
- The dress that Keckley designed for Mary Todd Lincoln to wear at her husband's second inauguration ceremony and reception is held by the Smithsonian's National Museum of American History.
- Keckley designed a quilt made from scraps of materials left over from dresses she made for Mrs. Lincoln. It is held by the Kent State University Museum and is shown in the book, The Threads of Time, The Fabric of History (2007), by Rosemary E. Reed Miller, which features Keckley among numerous African-American designers.
- The former school in Hillsborough, North Carolina, where Keckley worked for Rev. Robert Burwell, is now owned and operated as a house museum, the Burwell School Historic Site, by the Historic Hillsborough Commission. Its website discusses Keckley's life and times.
- On December 12, 2018, The New York Times published an obituary for Keckley, as a part of its Overlooked series of stories of remarkable individuals whose deaths went unreported by the newspaper.
- In 2022, Sarah Jessica Parker wore a dress to the Met Gala based on one of Keckley's designs from 1862 for Mary Todd Lincoln.

== Representations in culture ==
Films

- In Steven Spielberg's film Lincoln (2012), Keckley is portrayed by Gloria Reuben.

Television

- In 1988's Lincoln (miniseries) she was portrayed by Ruby Dee, who received an Emmy nomination for the role.
- In Apple TV+ miniseries' Manhunt (2024), Keckley is portrayed by Betty Gabriel.

Literature

- Tim Jorgenson's novel Mrs. Keckley Sends Her Regards (2007) portrays Keckley's intimate friendship with both of the Lincolns.
- Jennifer Chiaverini's novel Mrs. Lincoln's Dressmaker (2013) focuses on Mrs. Keckley's friendship with Mrs. Lincoln.
- George Saunders' novel, Lincoln in the Bardo (2017), quotes several passages from Mrs. Keckley's autobiography.

Plays

- Tazewell Thompson's play Mary T. & Lizzy K. opened in March 2013 at the Mead Center for American Theater in Washington, D.C.
- Paula Vogel's A Civil War Christmas, which opened at the New York Theatre Workshop in December 2012, included Keckley as a central character.

== See also ==
- List of slaves
- Abraham Lincoln and slavery
