= Debutante dress =

Gown worn by girls at debutante cotillions or for presentation at court

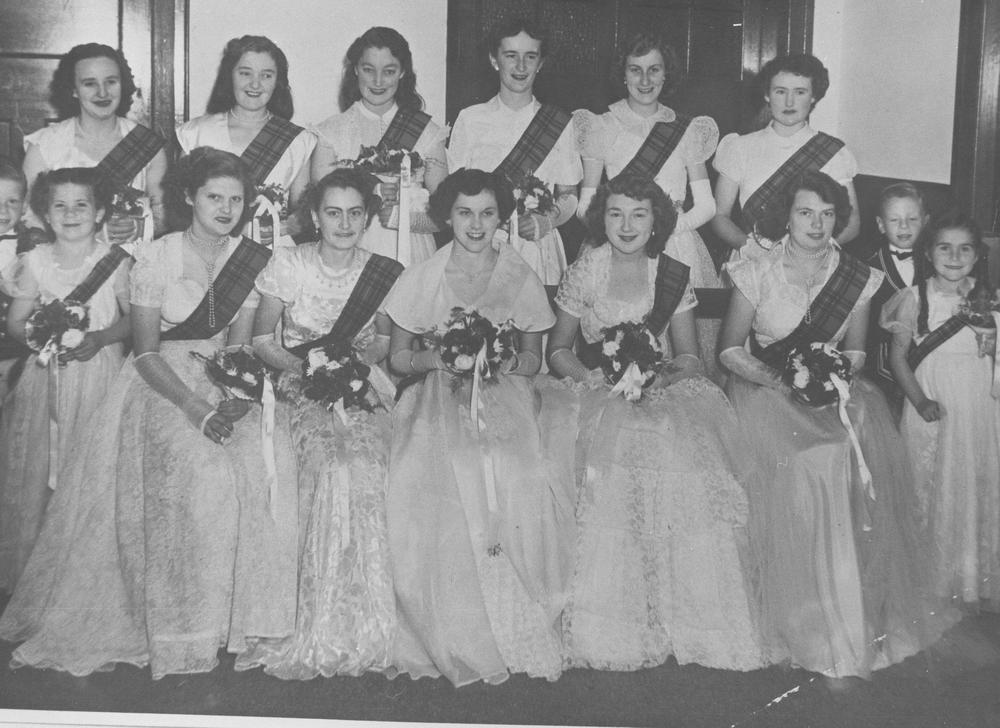
Debutante dresses in Australia in 1952

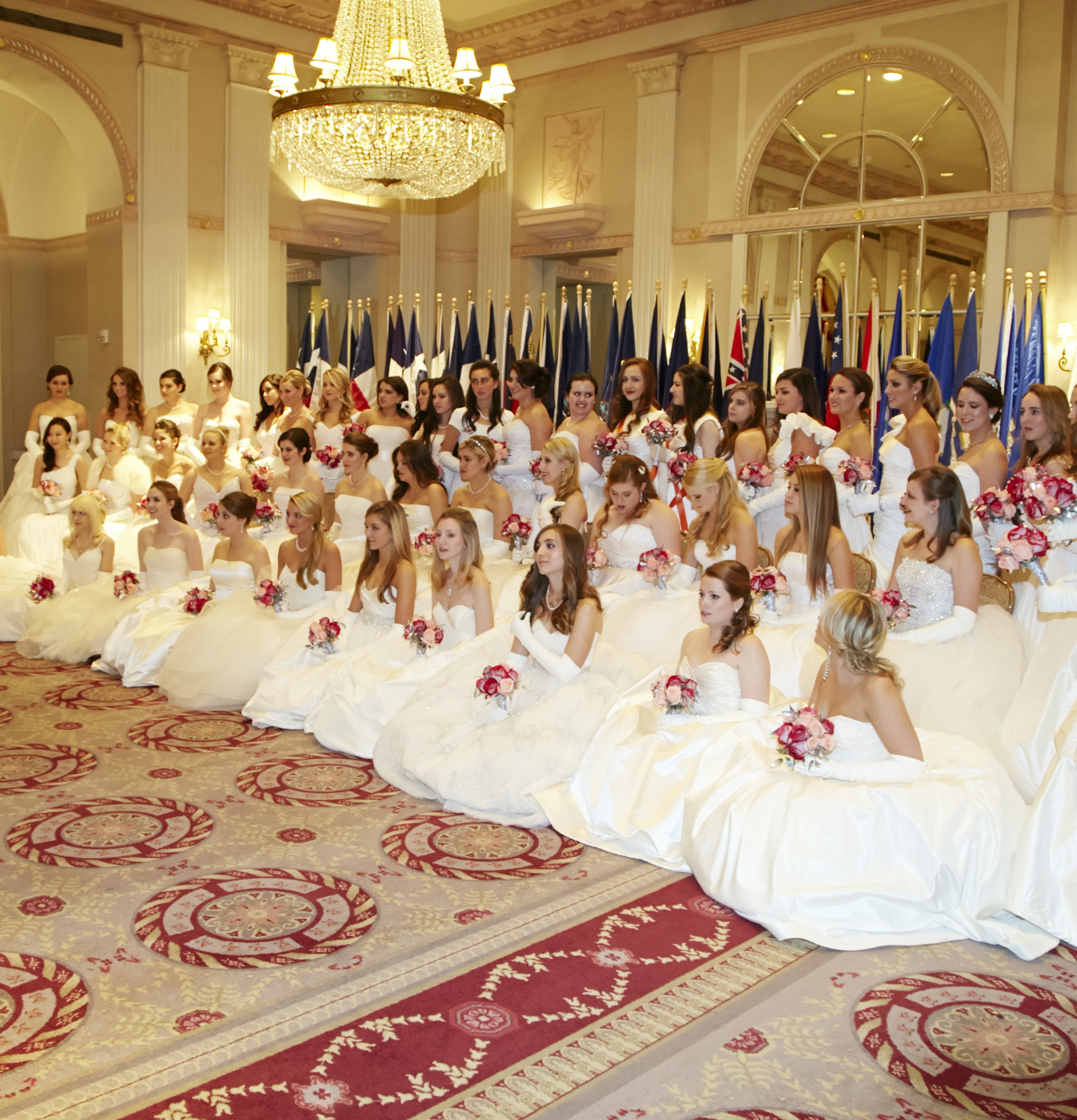
58th International Debutante Ball, 2012, New York City (Waldorf-Astoria Hotel)

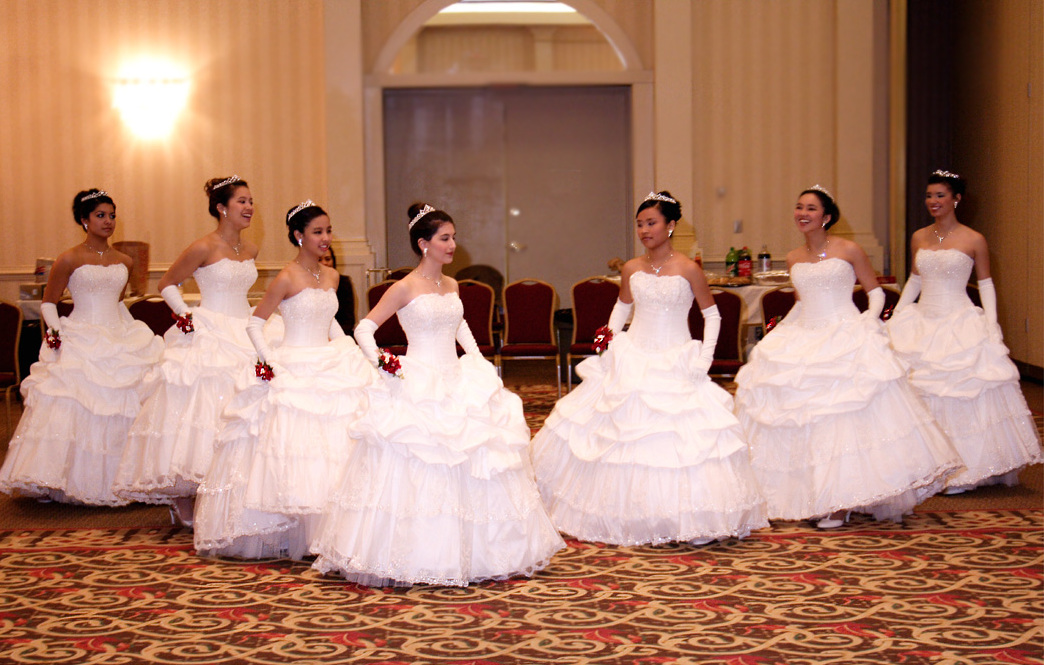
American debutantes, February 2009

A debutante dress is a pure white ball gown, accompanied by long white gloves and pearls worn by girls or young women at their debutante cotillion, although this may not always be the case. Debutante cotillions were traditional coming of age celebrations for eligible young ladies ready to be presented to society as ready for marriage.

== Required rules of dress ==
A young lady's gown was regulated by a set of meticulously defined rules which were strictly enforced. These rules varied from monarchy to monarchy and didn't always follow the fashion of the time. White was the preferred color for her gown, although soft colors such as ivory or eggshell were acceptable as long as they were over a white background. The headdress always included feathers and a veil although the number and size of the feathers varied with the time.

== History ==
=== Georgian era ===
During the reign of King George III and Queen Charlotte, the debutante dress featured panniers and elaborate trimmings which included a single ostrich plume worn on the head, even though simple dresses with high waists were favored by the last decades of his reign. During the reign of King George IV, the hoop skirt was excluded and the style for a debutante gown became a variation of whatever was considered popular for formal evening wear during the period.

=== Victorian era ===
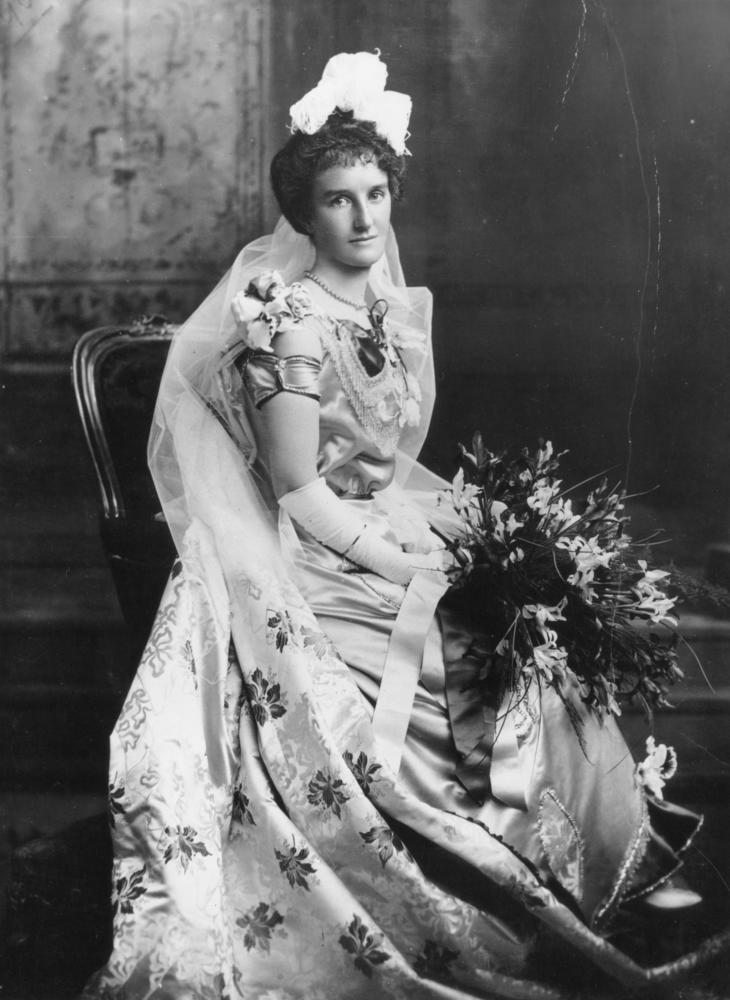
A debutante dress ca. 1890

Débutante dresses were almost always short-sleeved and had to have a low neckline. However a doctor's certificate could be presented at the time stating that low cut was injurious to the young woman's health. After a débutante married, if she had married appropriately, she would be re-presented at Court as a married woman, usually wearing her wedding dress with alterations.

Queen Victoria was said to have hated small feathers, so orders were sent out that Her Majesty wished to see the feathers as the young lady approached. Late in Queen Victoria's reign and into the court of Edward VII, the necessary headdress was three feathers arranged in a Prince of Wales plume. A center feather slightly higher than the two on each side is worn slightly on the left side of the head.

For young ladies and women to be present who were in mourning, it was acceptable for their dresses and veils to be black. No matter how cold the weather was on this special day, absolutely no cloaks, shawls, capes, or wraps of any kind were permitted to be worn. Those items remained in the lady's carriage.

== See also ==
- Debutante
- International Debutante Ball
- Vienna Opera Ball
