= Burwell Creek =

Stream in the U.S. state of Georgia

Coordinates: 34°15′47″N 85°10′16″W

Location
- Country: United States
- State: Georgia
- County: Floyd
- City: Rome

Physical characteristics
- Mouth: Oostanaula River
  - location: Rome, Georgia

Basin features
- Progression: Oostanaula River → Coosa River → Alabama River → Mobile River

Burwell Creek is a creek in Floyd County, in the U.S. state of Georgia. It is a tributary to the Oostanaula River which it joins within the city of Rome.

Burwell Creek was named for Judge Burwell, who settled nearby.

== See also ==
- List of rivers of Georgia (U.S. state)
