= Burwell School =

- Burwell School Historic Site
- U.S. National Register of Historic Places
- U.S. Historic district – Contributing property
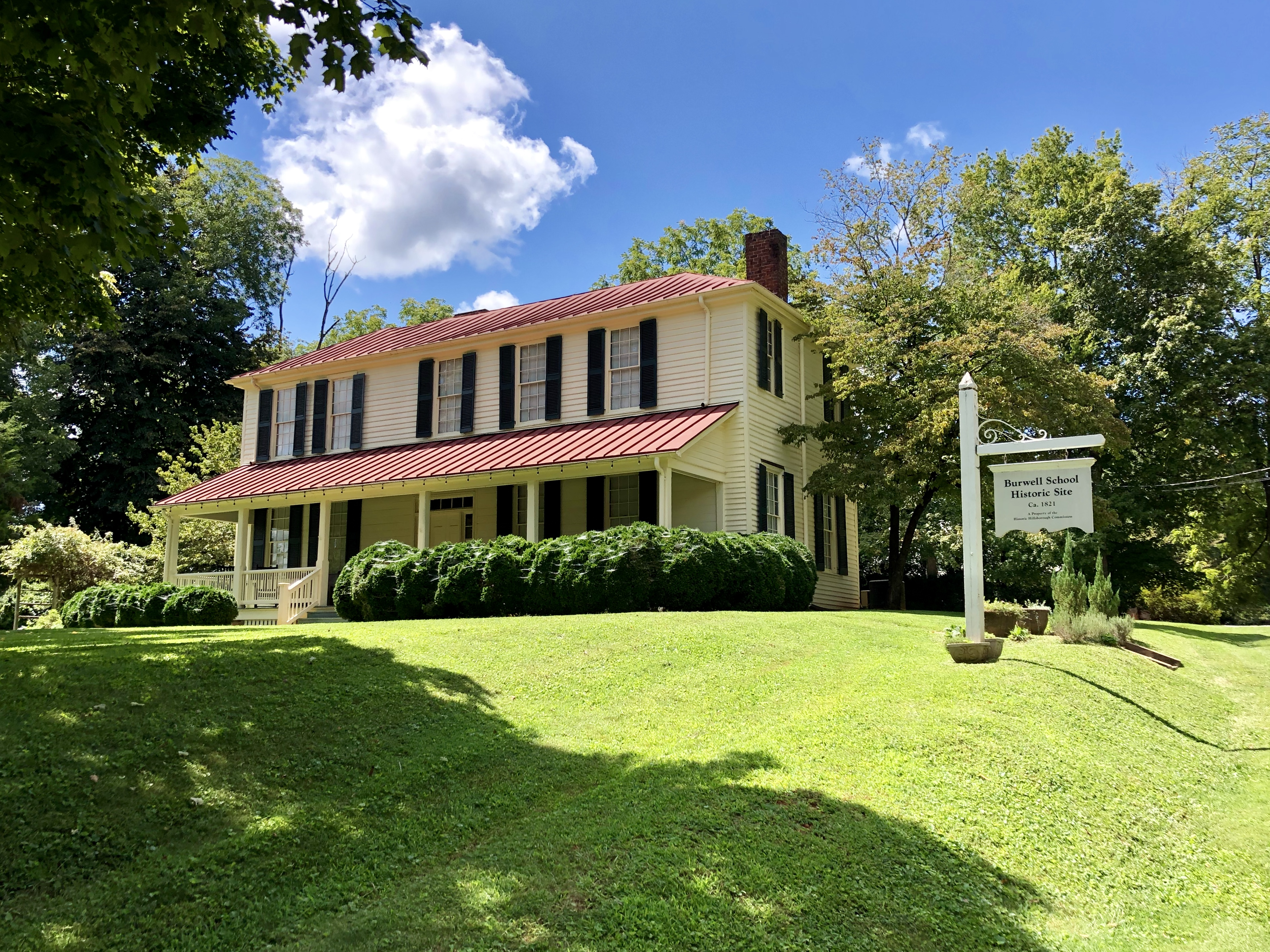

- Location within North Carolina Location within the United States
- Location: North Churton Street; Hillsborough, North Carolina, United States
- Coordinates: 36°4′45″N 79°6′0″W
- Area: 1.8 acres (0.73 hectares)
- Built: 1821 (house); 1837 (converted to school)
- Built by: Captain John Berry
- Architectural style: Federal
- NRHP reference No.: 70000465
- Added to NRHP: September 15, 1970

The Burwell School is an American historic site and former school, located in Hillsborough, North Carolina. On August 28, 2026, the site changed its name to The Elizabeth Keckly Center at the Burwell School. It is owned and operated by the Historic Hillsborough Commission, Inc., a North Carolina 501 (c) (3). The site is listed on the National Register of Historic Places and located in the Hillsborough Historic District.

== History ==
The house was first built in 1821 by Captain John Berry, a carpenter in the area. In 1835, Reverend Robert Burwell, his wife, Margaret Anna Burwell, and his two oldest children, Mary and John Bott, moved into the home after the Hillsborough Presbyterian Church bought the property to serve as a parsonage. Living with them was their slave Elizabeth Keckly (then Hobbes), who would as a free woman be known for her association with First Lady Mary Todd Lincoln.

Two years later, James Webb approached Mrs. Burwell and asked her to educate his daughters. She agreed, and opened a school for young ladies in her home. The school ran from 1837 to 1857, and enrolled more than 200 girls over those twenty years. In 1848, the Burwells hired the home's original builder to expand the home after they purchased it from the church. After Reverend Burwell left his position with the church, he joined the school's teaching staff, which also included several graduates of the program. The Burwell School remained open for 20 years before they shifted their attention to founding a women's college in Charlotte, North Carolina, that evolved to become Queens University of Charlotte.

In the years that followed, two notable families lived on the site: the Collins family from Edenton, North Carolina, and the Spurgeon Family, who were descendants of one of the Burwells' students. In 1964, the Historic Hillsborough Commission bought the property from the Spurgeon family and restored it to appear historically accurate for the antebellum period. The site is open to the public for tours and events.

== See also ==
- 1821 in architecture
