= Armistead Burwell (planter) =

American planter (1777–1841)

Armistead Burwell (December 13, 1777 – March 17, 1841) of Dinwiddie County, Virginia was a planter and a colonel of the United States Army in the War of 1812.

== Early life and education ==
Armistead Burwell, born on December 13, 1777, was the son of John and Ann Powell Burwell, who were married on December 5, 1771. He was the third of six children: Elizabeth, Anne, Armistead, Frances, Hannah, and Anna.

== Family ==
=== Marriage and children ===
On December 13, 1800, Burwell married Mary Cole Turnbull of White Hill, near Petersburg, Virginia. Their children were:

- Robert, who was a Presbyterian minister. He operated the Burwell School in Hillsborough, North Carolina.
- John
- Anne Burwell Garland, the wife of the proslavery Hugh A. Garland, a St. Louis lawyer.
- Lewis
- Mary Cole
- Armistead Burwell of Mississippi, a Union loyalist during the American Civil War.
- Benjamin Powell
- Frances King
- Charles who died at 8 days old.
- Charles Blair
- William Turnbell Burwell, who was killed in the Mexican War on September 8, 1847, and is buried in Mississippi.
- Nathaniel Harrison died in infancy
- Elizabeth Margaret

He was a grandfather of Armistead Burwell, a North Carolina Supreme Court Justice.

=== Fathered Elizabeth Keckley ===
Burrell raped one of the women he enslaved, Agnes, and it resulted in a pregnancy. Elizabeth Hobbs Keckley was born about 1818 at Burwell's estate in Dinwiddie County Court House, Dinwiddie, Virginia, just south of Petersburg. Because her mother was a slave, Elizabeth was born into slavery as well.

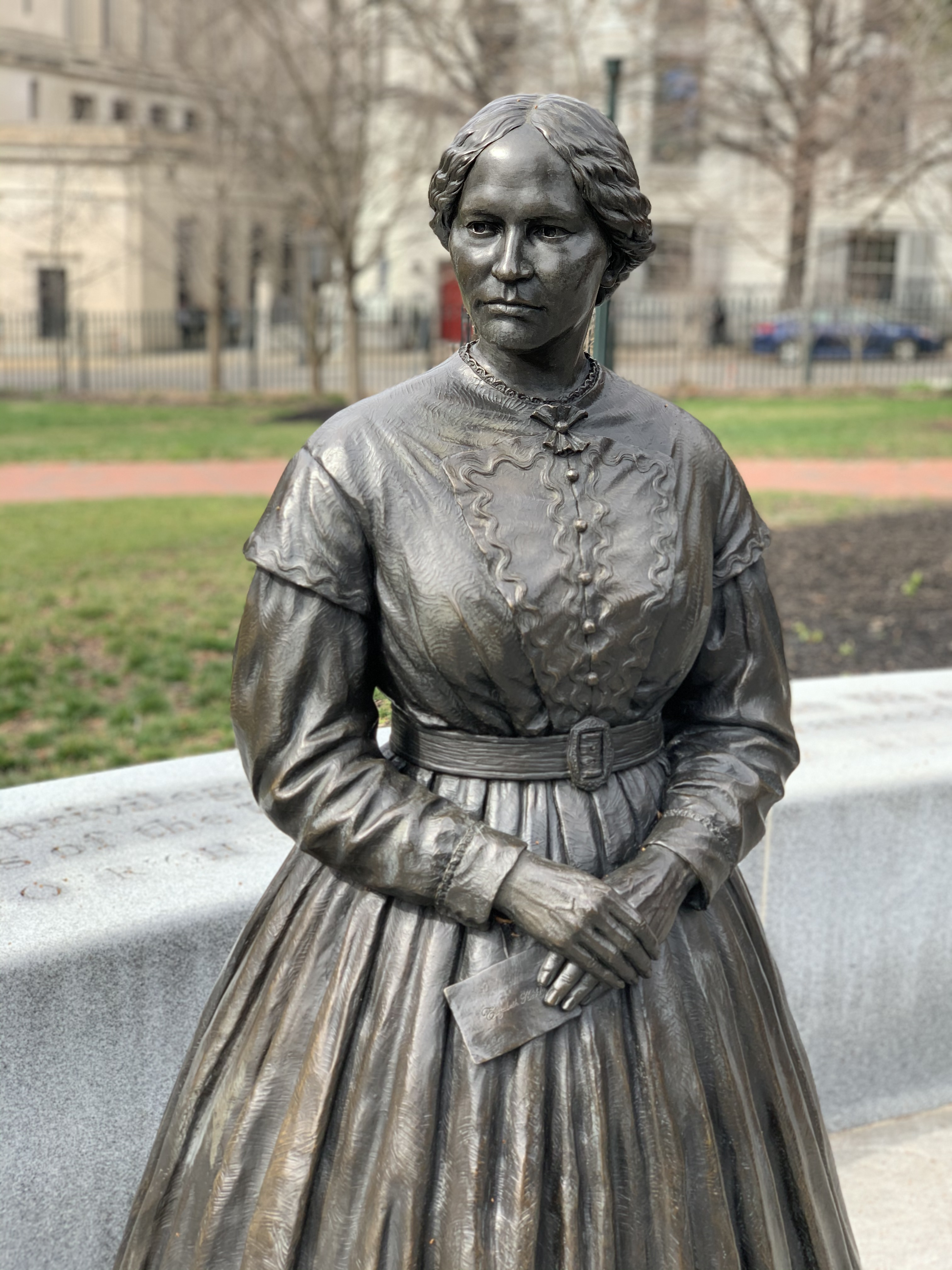
Statue of Elizabeth Keckley included in the Virginia Women's Monument

Agnes made clothes for 82 people, 12 members of the Burwell family and 70 slaves. She learned to read and write, which was rare for slaves. Burwell permitted Agnes to marry George Pleasant Hobbs, a literate enslaved man who lived and worked at a neighbor's house during Keckley's early childhood. Keckley learned that her father was Armistead Burwell from her mother just before she died.

Keckley became the modiste and close friend to Mary Todd Lincoln, wife of Abraham Lincoln, which is detailed in her 1868 memoir Behind the Scenes: Or, Thirty Years a Slave and Four Years in the White House. Her autobiography includes accounts of brutal treatment by the Burwell family and friends of Armistead Burwell including rape and whippings.

== Career ==
Burwell enslaved over fifty people.

== Death ==
He died at Mansfield, near Petersburg, in 1841. He is buried in Blandford Cemetery in Petersburg, Virginia.
