= Social War =

Social War may refer to:

- Social War (357–355 BC), or the War of the Allies, fought between the Second Athenian Empire and the allies of Chios, Rhodes, and Cos as well as Byzantium
- Social War (220–217 BC), fought among the southern Greek states
- Social War (91–87 BC), or the Italian or Marsic War, fought between the Roman Republic and several Italian cities
- The Social War, an 1872 novel by Simon Mohler Landis
