= Thomas Ustick Walter =

American architect (1804-1887)

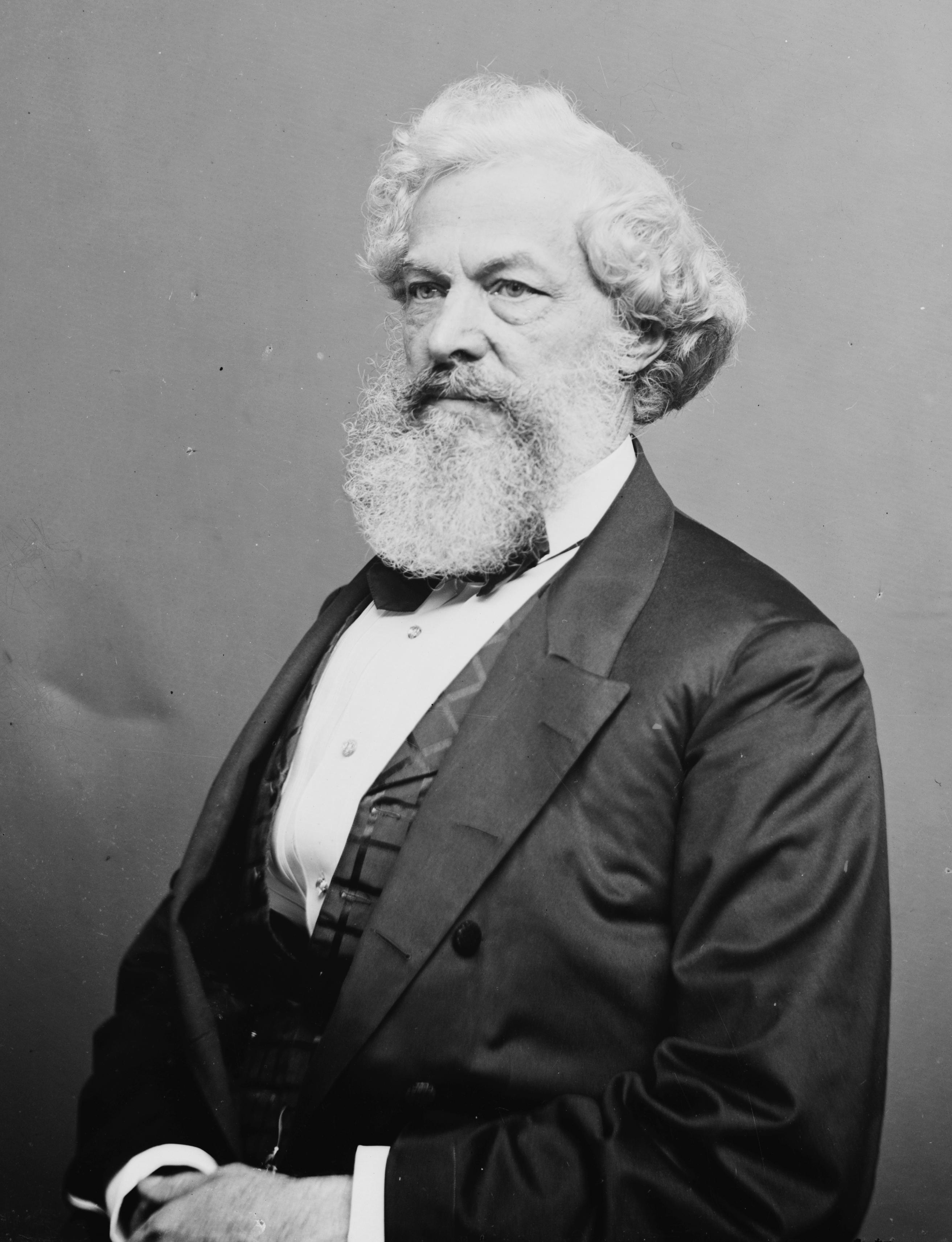

Architect of the Capitol
- In office June 11, 1851 – May 26, 1865
- President: Millard Fillmore; Franklin Pierce; James Buchanan; Abraham Lincoln; Andrew Johnson
- Preceded by: Charles Bulfinch
- Succeeded by: Edward Clark

Personal details
- Born: September 4, 1804 Philadelphia, Pennsylvania, U.S.
- Died: October 30, 1887 (aged 83) Washington, D.C., U.S.
- Resting place: Laurel Hill Cemetery, Philadelphia, Pennsylvania, U.S.
- Profession: Architect, Civil Engineer

Thomas Ustick Walter (September 4, 1804 – October 30, 1887) was an American architect. He worked on more than 400 projects, including Moyamensing Prison and Girard College in Philadelphia. He served as the fourth Architect of the Capitol, and led the addition of the north and south wings and the central dome. He retired in 1865, but financial difficulties forced him back to work in the 1870s, including a job as Chief Assistant to the Architect of Philadelphia City Hall.

A founder of the American Institute of Architects, he served as its president from 1876 to 1887.

== Early life and education ==
Walter was born on September 4, 1804, in Philadelphia. He was the son of mason and bricklayer Joseph S. Walter and his wife Deborah. His grandfather, Frederick Jacob Walter, emigrated from Germany in 1749 and arrived in Philadelphia as an orphan after both parents died at sea. Walter showed an aptitude for mathematics and drawing at an early age. He worked as a bricklayer for his father during the construction of the Second Bank of the United States and studied architecture in the office of William Strickland.

He attended the School of Mechanic Arts at the Franklin Institute in Philadelphia and studied under John Haviland.

Later in life, he received an honorary Masters of Arts degree from Madison University in 1849, a Ph.D. from the University of Lewisburg in 1853, and a Doctor of Laws degree from Harvard University in 1857.

== Career ==
Walter established his architectural design practice in 1830. The following year, he was appointed chief architect of the planned Moyamensing Prison. In 1833, the Philadelphia City Council accepted his design for Girard College; he led construction until its completion in 1847.

In 1829, Walter was elected to the Franklin Institute; he would serve the museum in several roles, including as professor of architecture in 1841 and as chairman of the Board of Managers in 1846.

In 1836, he recommended the creation of the American Institution of Architects and served as secretary. That organization failed, but in 1857, he would help to found the American Institute of Architects, for which he served as vice-president in 1857 and as president from 1876 to 1887.

In 1838, the building committee of Girard College funded a European trip for Walter. He visited England, Ireland, France, and Italy to study the architecture and construction of schools and other buildings and gather ideas for his work at the college.

In 1839, he was elected to the American Philosophical Society.

In 1841, a local economic downturn created financial hardship for Walter. He was forced to sell his house and most of his architectural library. In 1843, he was commissioned to build a breakwater for the port of LaGuaira, Venezuela, and completed the work in 1845.

=== The U.S. Capitol and its dome ===
Inauguration of Abraham Lincoln, March 4, 1861, beneath the unfinished Capitol dome

In 1851, Walter was selected by President Millard Fillmore to lead the expansion of the U.S. Capitol. The office of the Architect of the Capitol, originally part of the Department of the Interior, was from 1853 to 1862 placed under the War Department. Walter's work was supervised by Montgomery C. Meigs and William B. Franklin. Work was discontinued at the outbreak of the American Civil War, and when it started up again in 1862, his department was again supervised by the Department of the Interior.

Construction on the wings began in 1851. The House of Representatives met in its new quarters in December 1857 and the Senate occupied its new chamber by January 1859. Walter's fireproof cast-iron dome was authorized by Congress on March 3, 1855, and was nearly completed by December 2, 1863, when the Statue of Freedom was placed on top. The dome's cast-iron frame was made by the iron foundry Janes, Fowler, Kirtland & Co. The 36 Corinthian columns designed by Walter, as well as 144 cast-iron structural pillars for the dome, were supplied by the Baltimore ironworks of Poole & Hunt. Walter also rebuilt the interior of the Library of Congress' west center building after the fire of 1851. Walter continued as Capitol architect until 1865, when he resigned his position over a minor contract dispute. After 14 years in Washington, he retired to Philadelphia.

In the 1870s, financial setbacks forced Walter from retirement. He worked for a year as a draftsman for the Pennsylvania Railroad. He worked as Chief Assistant to his friend and younger colleague John McArthur Jr., when he won the design competition for Philadelphia City Hall. He continued on that vast project until his death in 1887. He was interred at Laurel Hill Cemetery in Philadelphia.

== Works ==
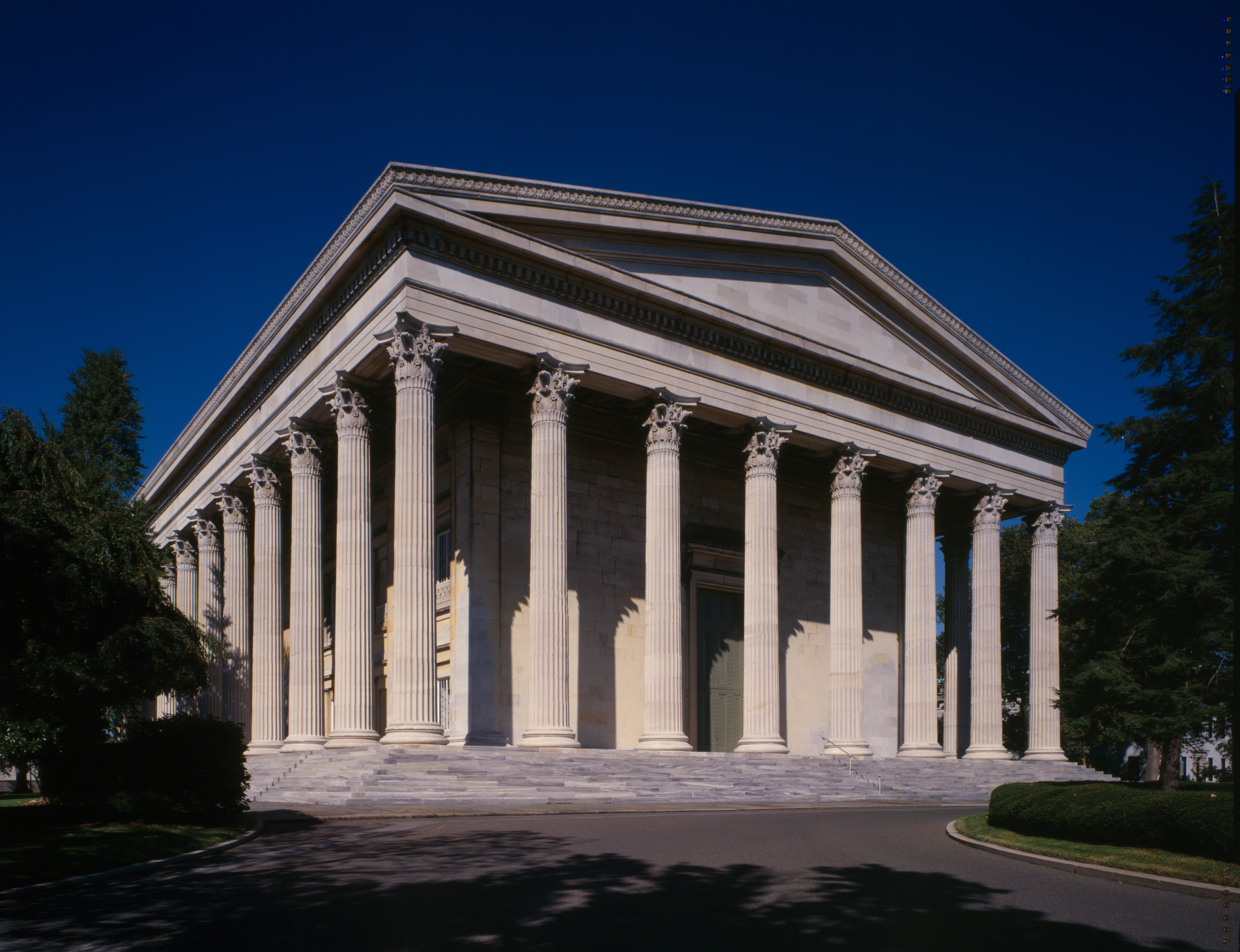
Founder's Hall, Girard College, Philadelphia

Walter worked on over 400 projects over his career, including:

- Spruce Street Baptist Church, 418 Spruce St., Philadelphia, Pennsylvania (1829)
- Portico Row, 900–930 Spruce St., Philadelphia (1831–32)
- Moyamensing Prison, Philadelphia (1832–35)
- First Presbyterian Church of West Chester, West Chester, Pennsylvania (1832)
- Wills Eye Hospital, Logan Square, Philadelphia (1832)
- Central Presbyterian Church, Philadelphia (1833)
- Founder's Hall, Girard College for Orphans, Philadelphia (1833–1848)
- Expansion of Andalusia, Bensalem Township, Pennsylvania (1833–32)
- St. George's Hall, residence of Matthew Newkirk (1835)
- Interior renovation of Christ Church, Philadelphia, (1835–36)

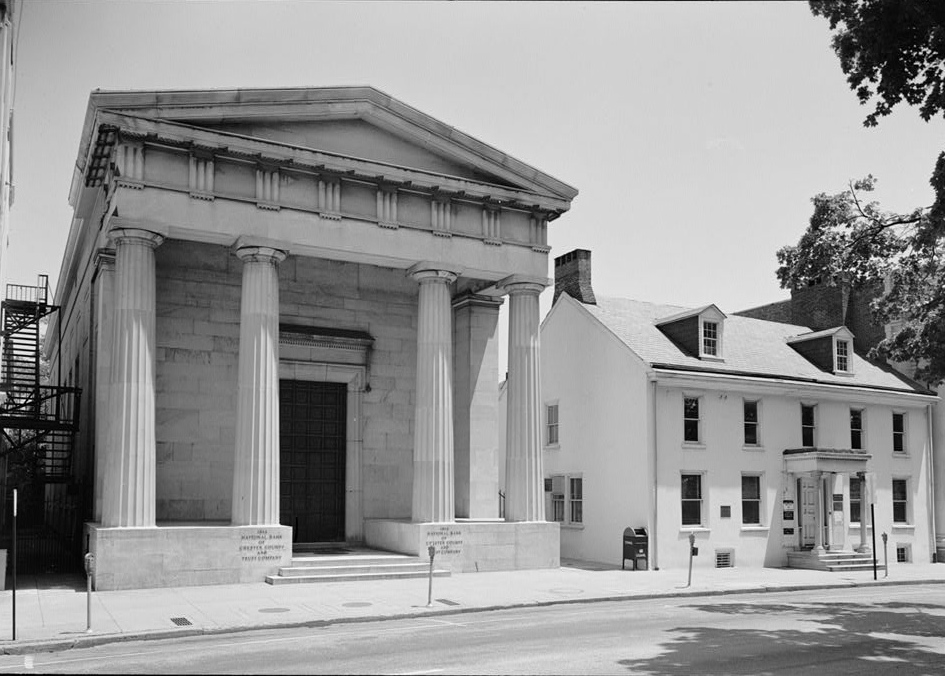
Bank of Chester County in West Chester, Pennsylvania

- Bank of Chester County, West Chester, Pa. (1836)
- West Chester Young Ladies Seminary, West Chester (1838)
- Newkirk Viaduct Monument, West Philadelphia, Philadelphia (1839)
- St. James Episcopal Church, Wilmington, North Carolina (1839–40)
- Norfolk Academy Norfolk, Virginia (1840)
- Lexington Presbyterian Church, Lexington, Virginia (1843)
- Breakwater, La Guaira, Venezuela (1843–45)
- Chapel of the Cross, Chapel Hill, North Carolina (1843)
- Tabb Street Presbyterian Church, Petersburg, Virginia (1843)
- Winder Houses, 232-34 S. 3rd St., Philadelphia (1843)
- Chester County Courthouse, West Chester (1846–47)
- Chester County Horticultural Hall, West Chester (1848)

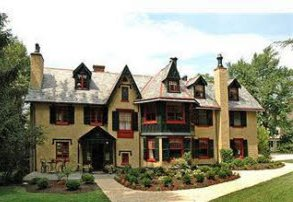
Inglewood Cottage in Philadelphia

- Inglewood Cottage, Chestnut Hill, Philadelphia (c. 1850)
- Ingleside, Washington, D.C. (c. 1850)
- Fifth Presbyterian Church, 500 I Street N.W., Washington, D.C. (1852)
- Completion of East Wing, Old Patent Office Building, Washington, D.C. (–1853)
- West Wing, Old Patent Office Building, Washington, D.C. (1851–54, burned 1877)
- First Baptist Church, Montgomery, Alabama (1854)
- United States Capitol dome, Washington, D.C. (1855–1866)
- Preliminary design for expansion of the Treasury Building, Washington, D.C. (c. 1855)
- Expansion of the General Post Office, Washington, D.C. (1855–66)
- Marine Barracks, Pensacola, Florida (1857)
- Marine Barracks, Brooklyn, New York (1858–59)
- Garrett-Dunn House, 7048 Germantown Ave, Mt. Airy, Philadelphia (c. 1850, burned 2009)
- Thomas Ustick Walter House, Germantown, Philadelphia (1860–61, demolished c. 1920)
- Eutaw Place Baptist Church, Baltimore, Maryland (1868–71)

== Personal life ==
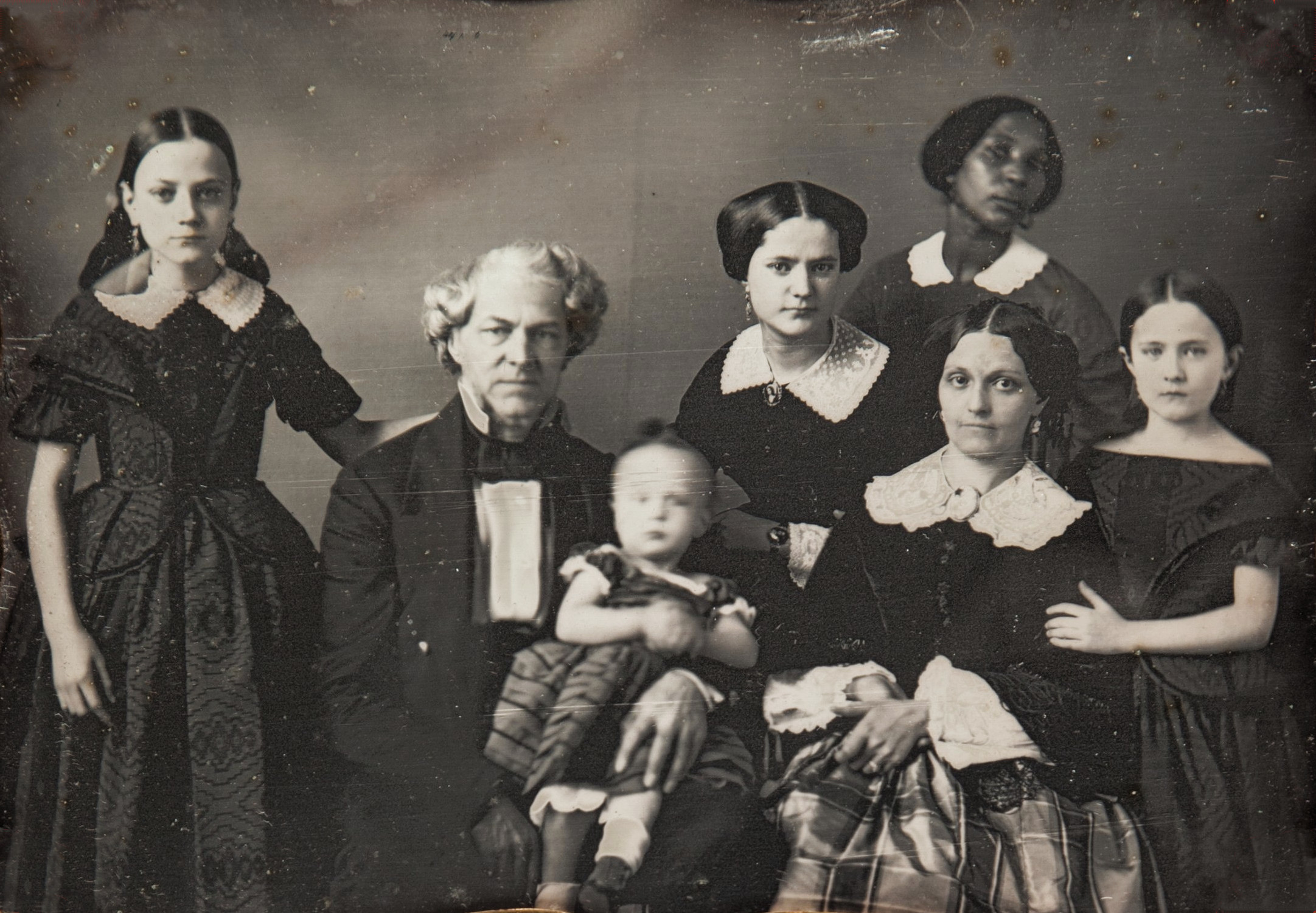
Walter family with servant, circa 1850

He married Mary Ann Elizabeth Hancocks in 1824. She died during childbirth in 1847. He was remarried to Amanda Gardiner in 1848. He had 13 children, seven of whom outlived him. His grandson, Thomas Ustick Walter III, was an architect who practiced in Birmingham, Alabama, from the 1890s to the 1910s.

== Legacy ==
For his architectural accomplishments, Walter is honored in a ceiling mosaic in the East Mosaic Corridor at the entrance to the Main Reading Room of the Library of Congress.

A historical marker highlighting the location of Walter's house in Philadelphia was erected in 2009 by the Philadelphia Historical and Museum Commission.

== Gallery ==
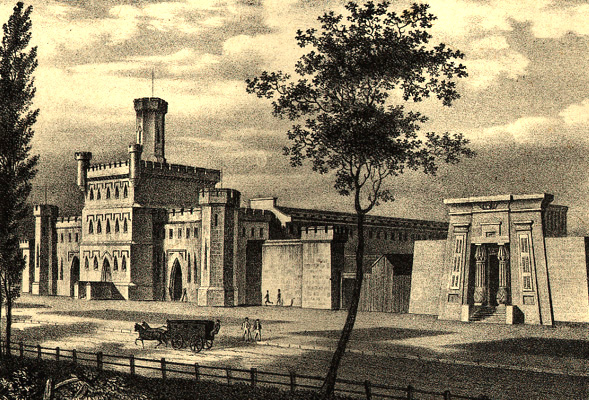
Moyamensing Prison, Philadelphia (1832–35, demolished 1968)

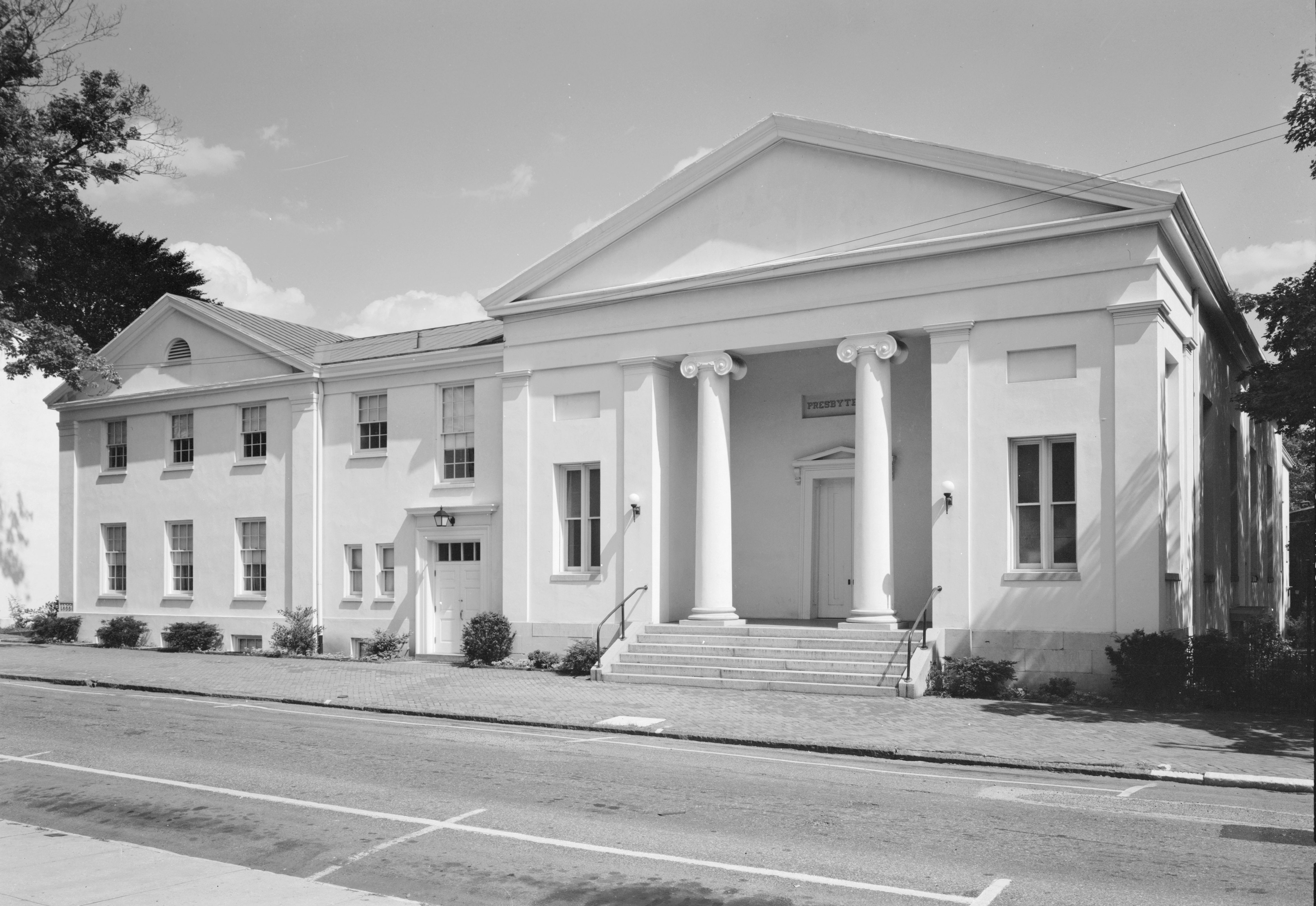
One of Walter's first commissions, the First Presbyterian Church, West Chester, Pennsylvania (1832)

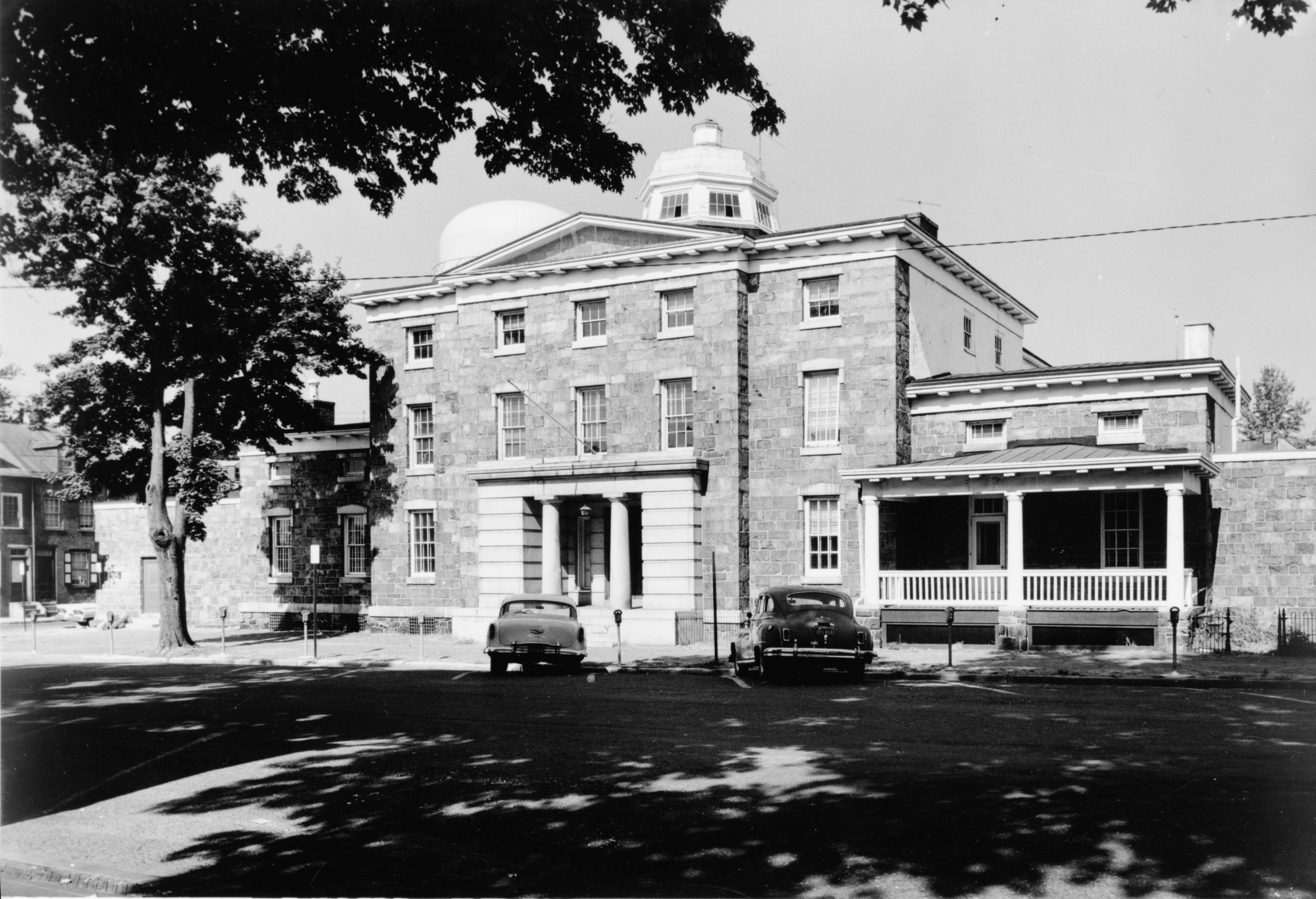
Chester County Prison, West Chester (1838, demolished 1960)

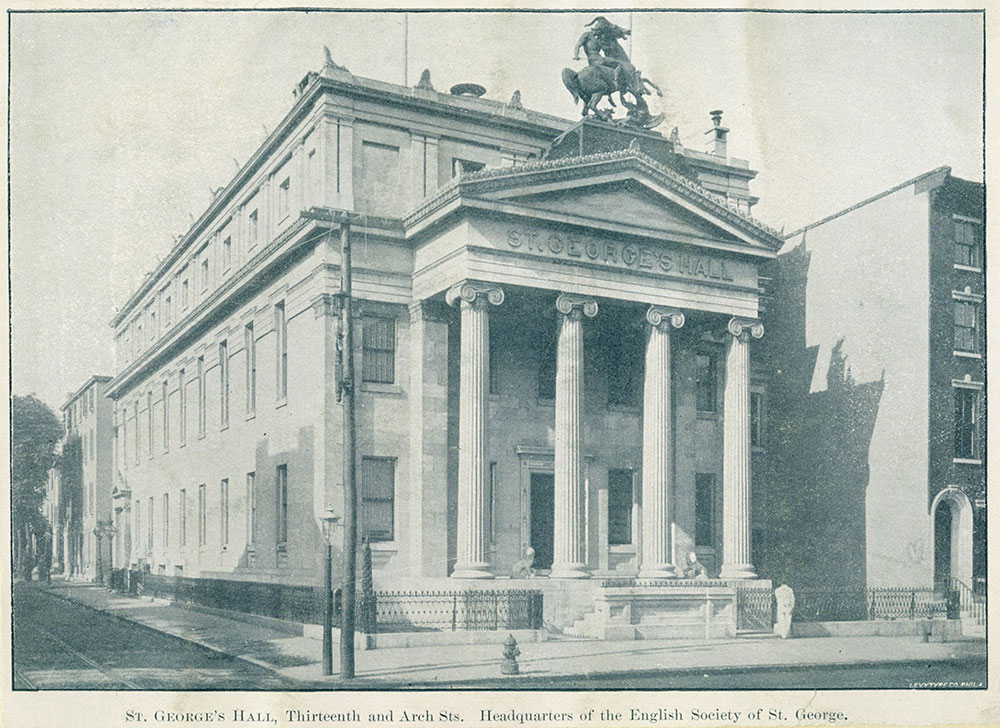
St. George's Hall in Philadelphia

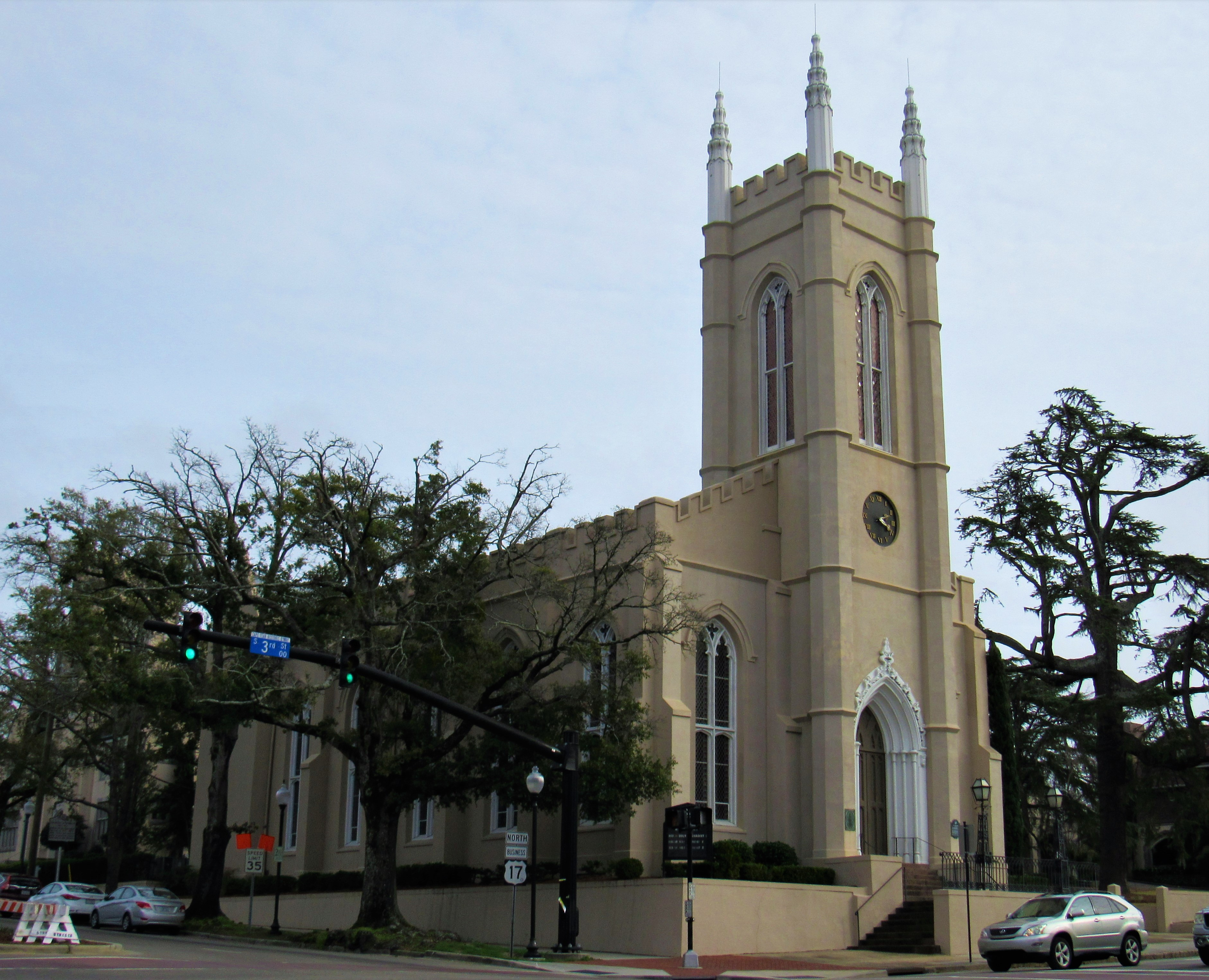
St. James Episcopal Church, Wilmington, North Carolina (1839–40)

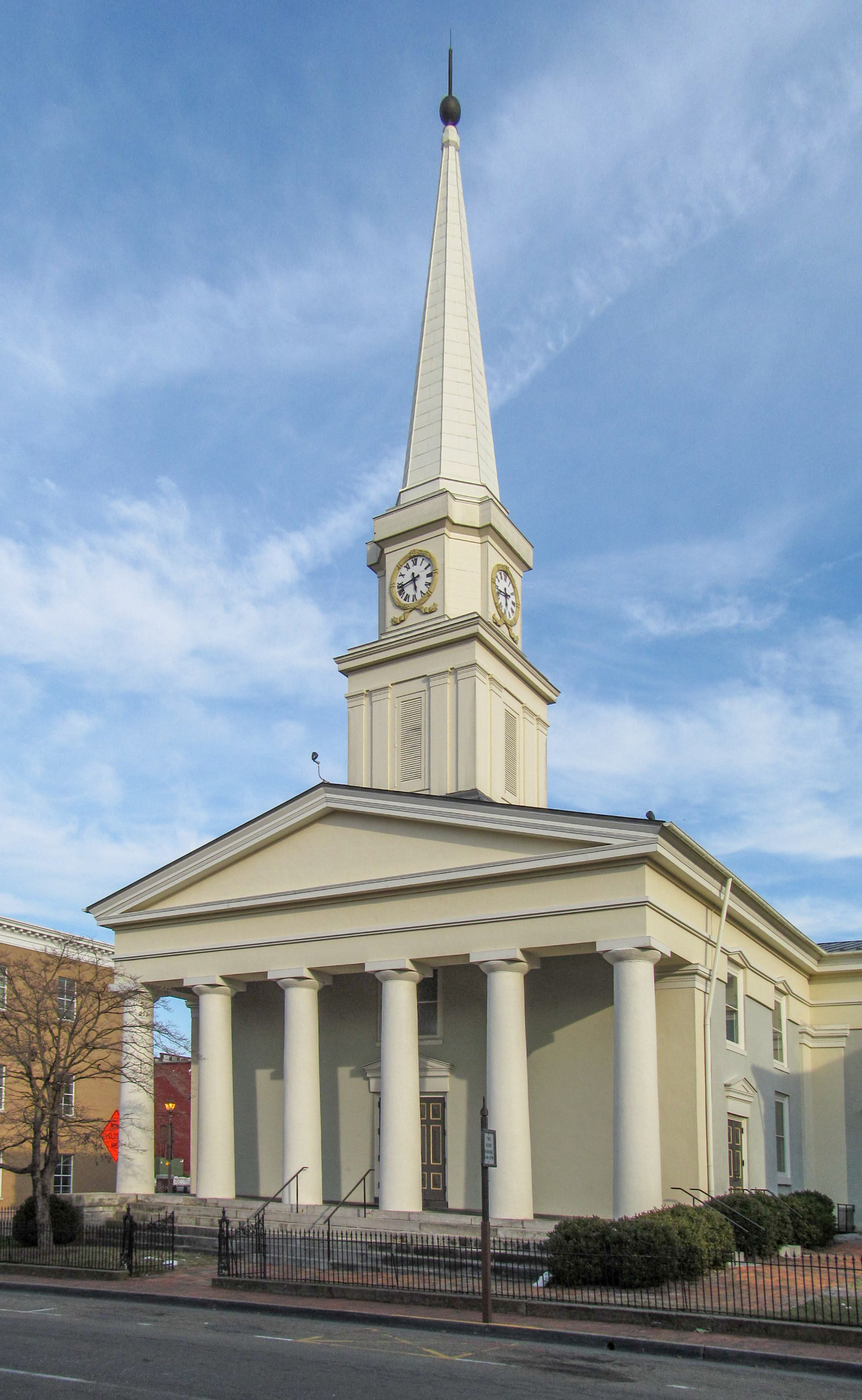
Lexington Presbyterian Church, Lexington, Virginia (1843–45)

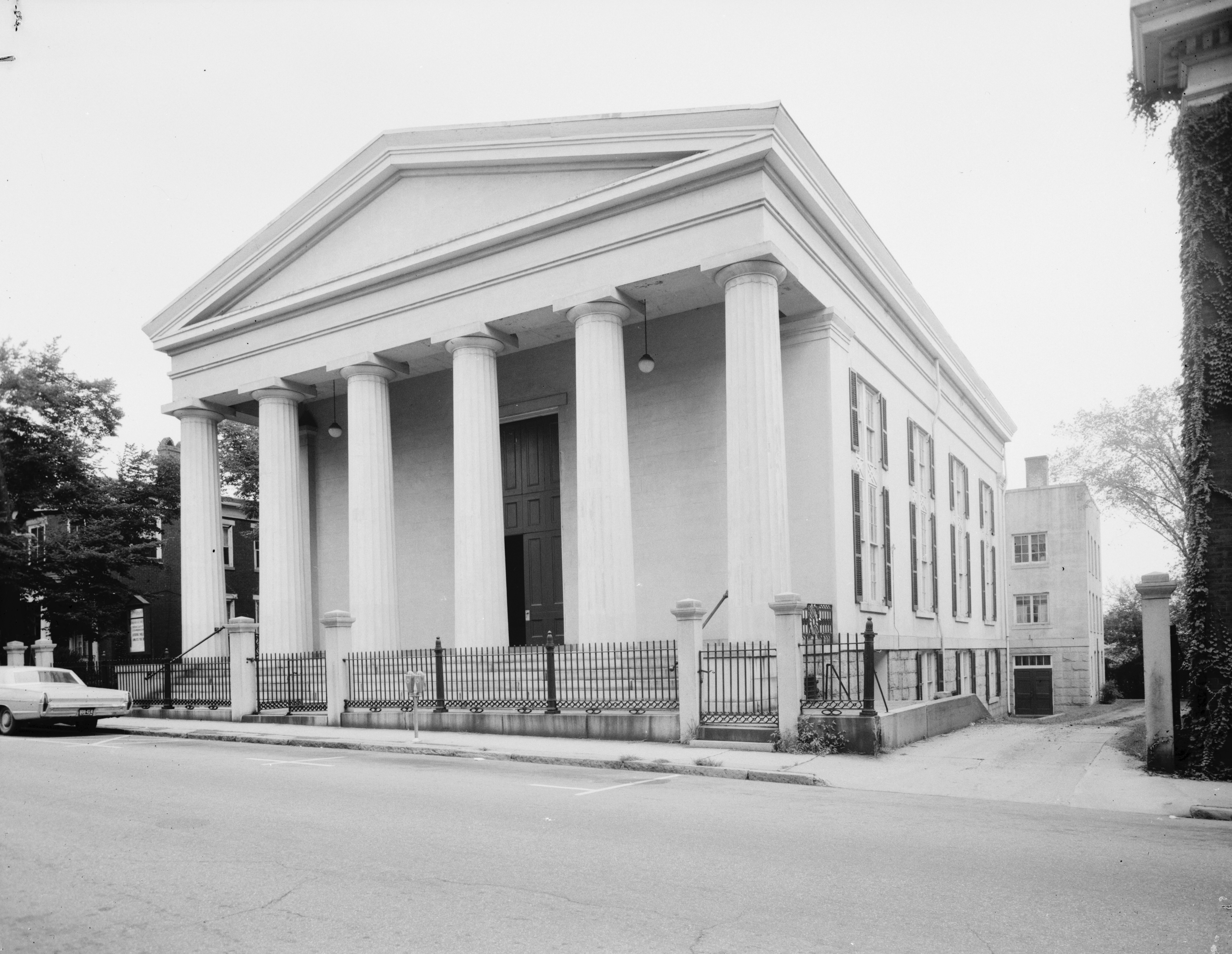
Tabb Street Presbyterian Church, Petersburg, Virginia (1843)

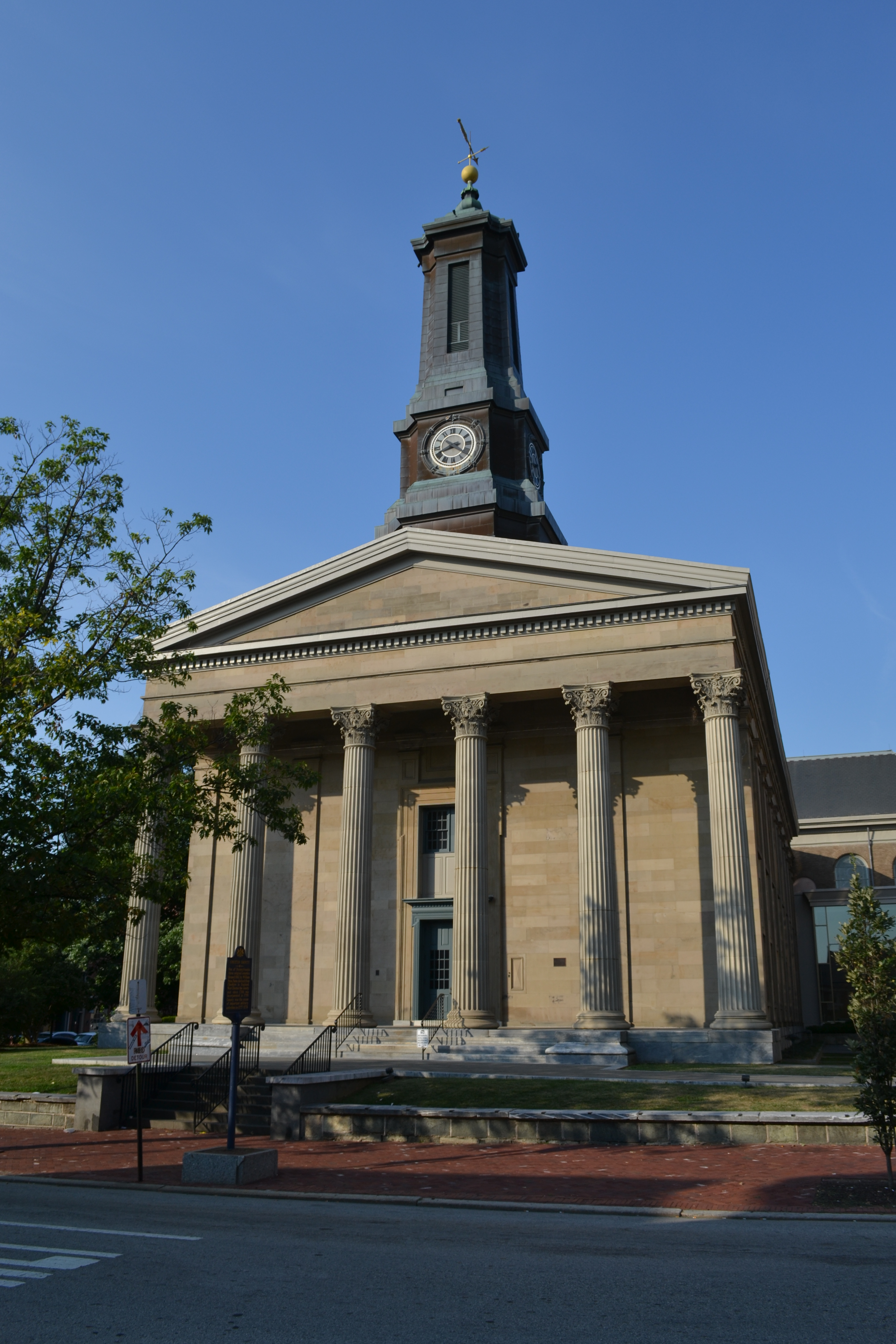
Chester County Courthouse, West Chester (1846–47)

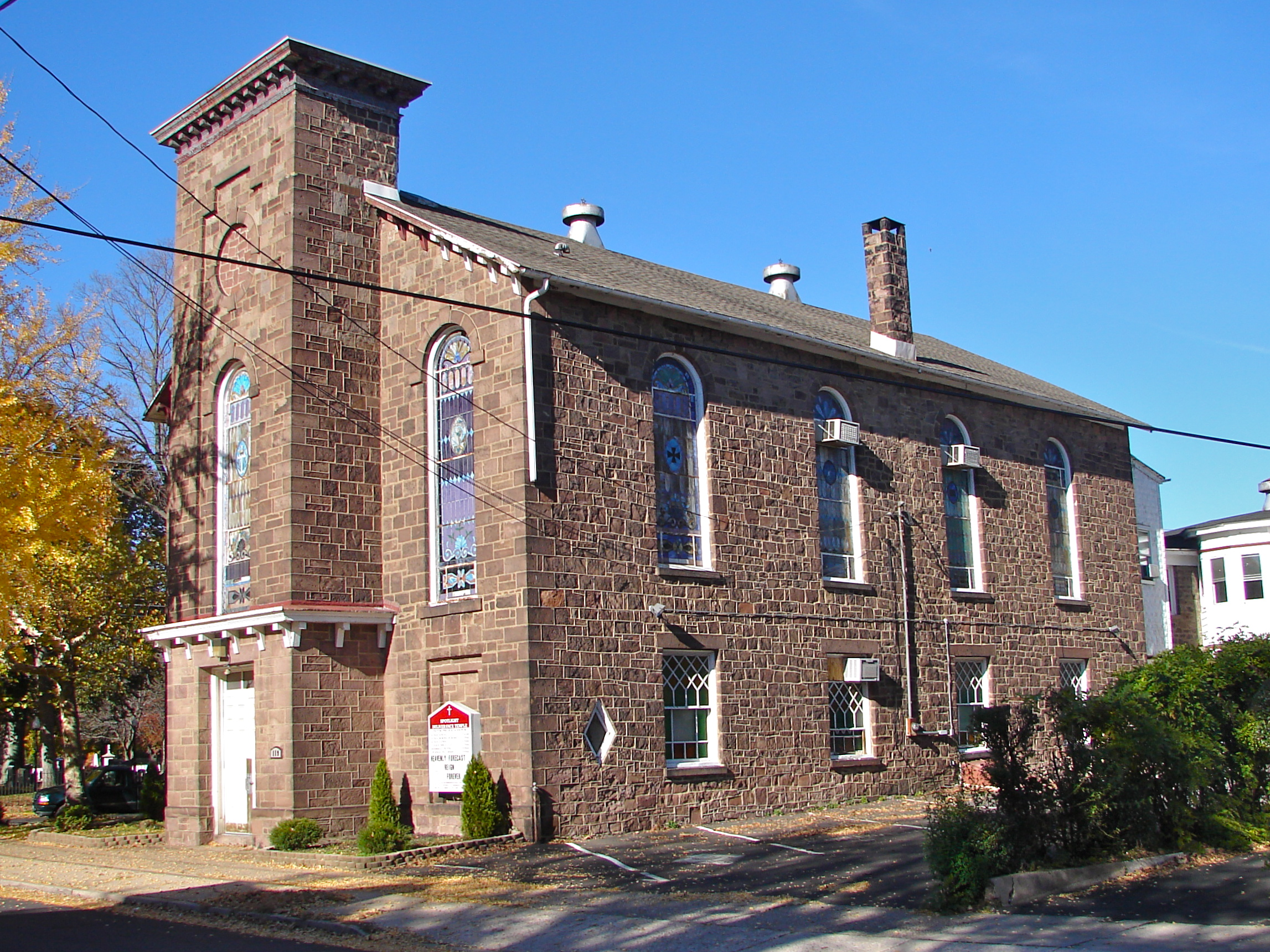
First Baptist Church, Bristol, Pennsylvania (1851)

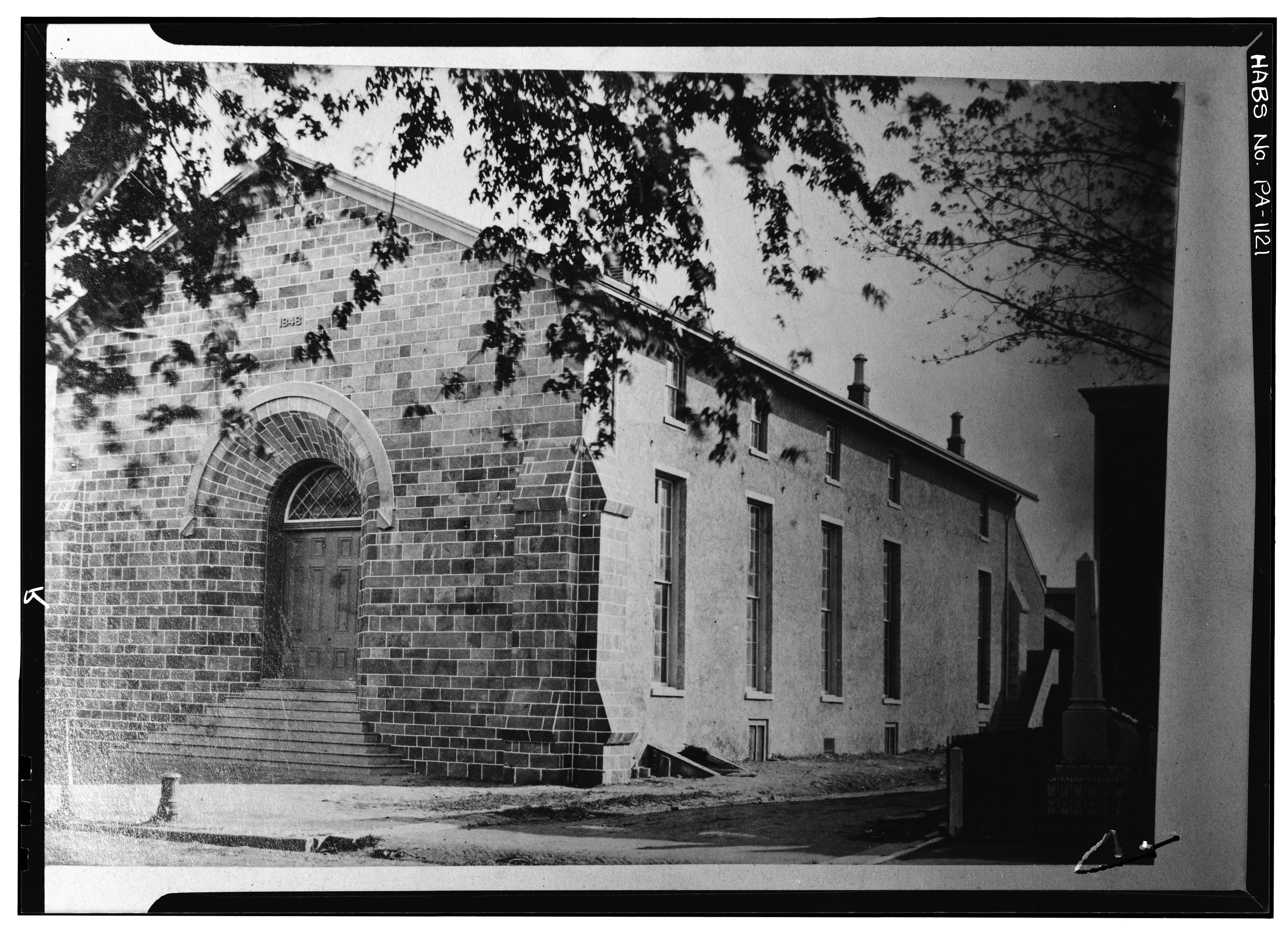
Horticultural Hall now Chester County History Center, West Chester (1848)

== See Also ==
- List of American architects

Political offices
Preceded by Charles Bulfinch	Architect of the Capitol; 1851–1865	Succeeded by Edward Clark
