= Portico Row =

Historic house in Pennsylvania, United States

- U.S. National Register of Historic Places
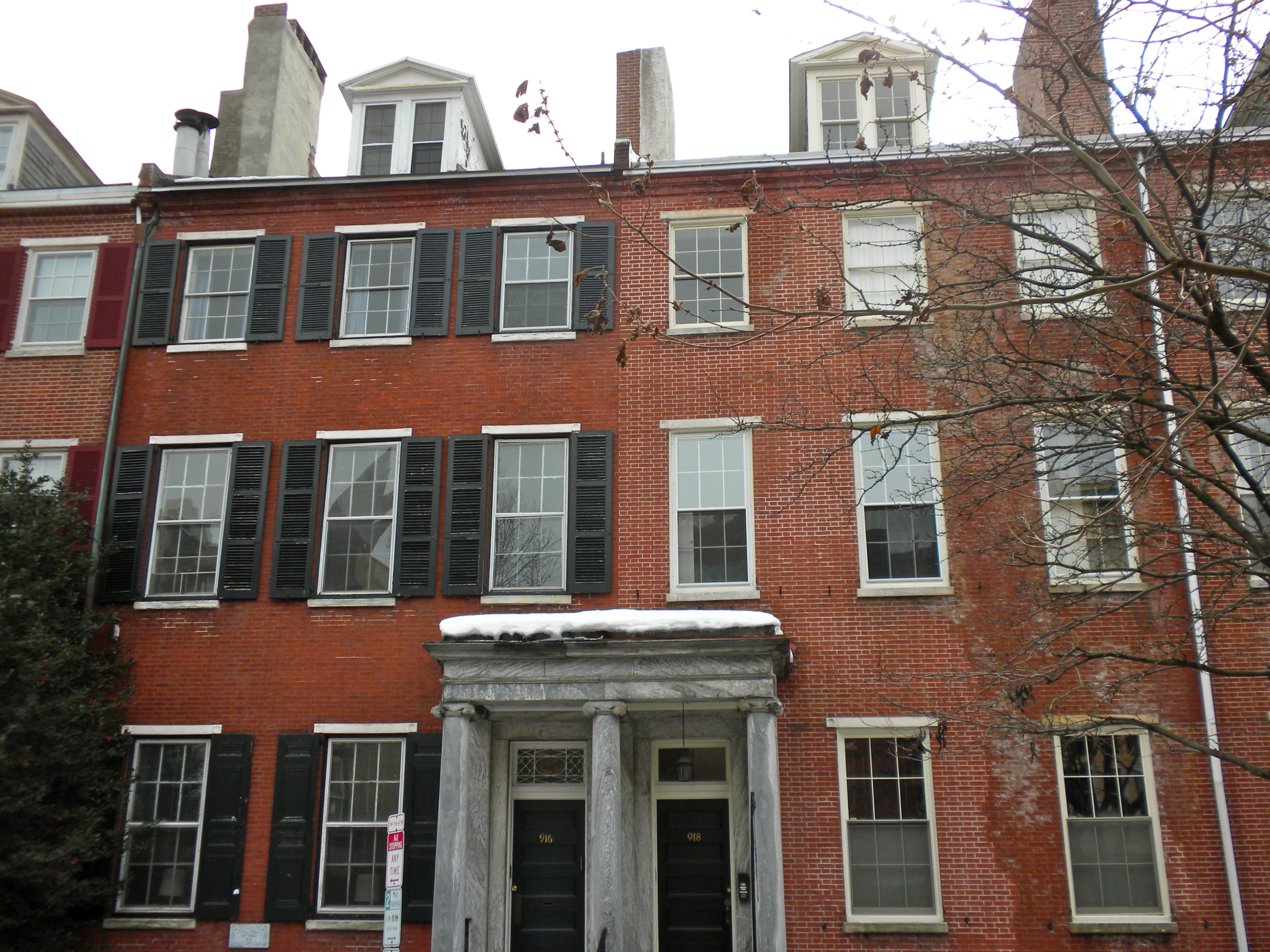
- Portico Row, February 2010

- Location within Philadelphia Location within Pennsylvania Location within the United States
- Location: 900–930 Spruce Street, Philadelphia, Pennsylvania
- Coordinates: 39°56′45″N 75°9′29″W
- Area: 1.3 acres (0.53 ha)
- Built: 1831–1832
- Architect: Thomas Ustick Walter
- Architectural style: Greek Revival
- NRHP reference No.: 77001189
- Added to NRHP: December 16, 1977

Portico Row is a set of sixteen historic rowhouses located in the Washington Square West neighborhood of Philadelphia, Pennsylvania.

== History and architectural features ==
These brick houses were built between 1831 and 1832 and were designed by Philadelphia architect Thomas Ustick Walter (1804–1887). Created using the typical Philadelphia rowhouse plan with front building, piazza, and back building, they were designed in the Greek Revival style. Each of the eight mirror-image pairs shared a common entrance portico supported by Ionic order columns.

The houses were documented by the Historic American Buildings Survey in 1975 and added to the National Register of Historic Places in 1977.
