= First Presbyterian Church of West Chester =

Historic church in Pennsylvania, United States

- U.S. National Register of Historic Places
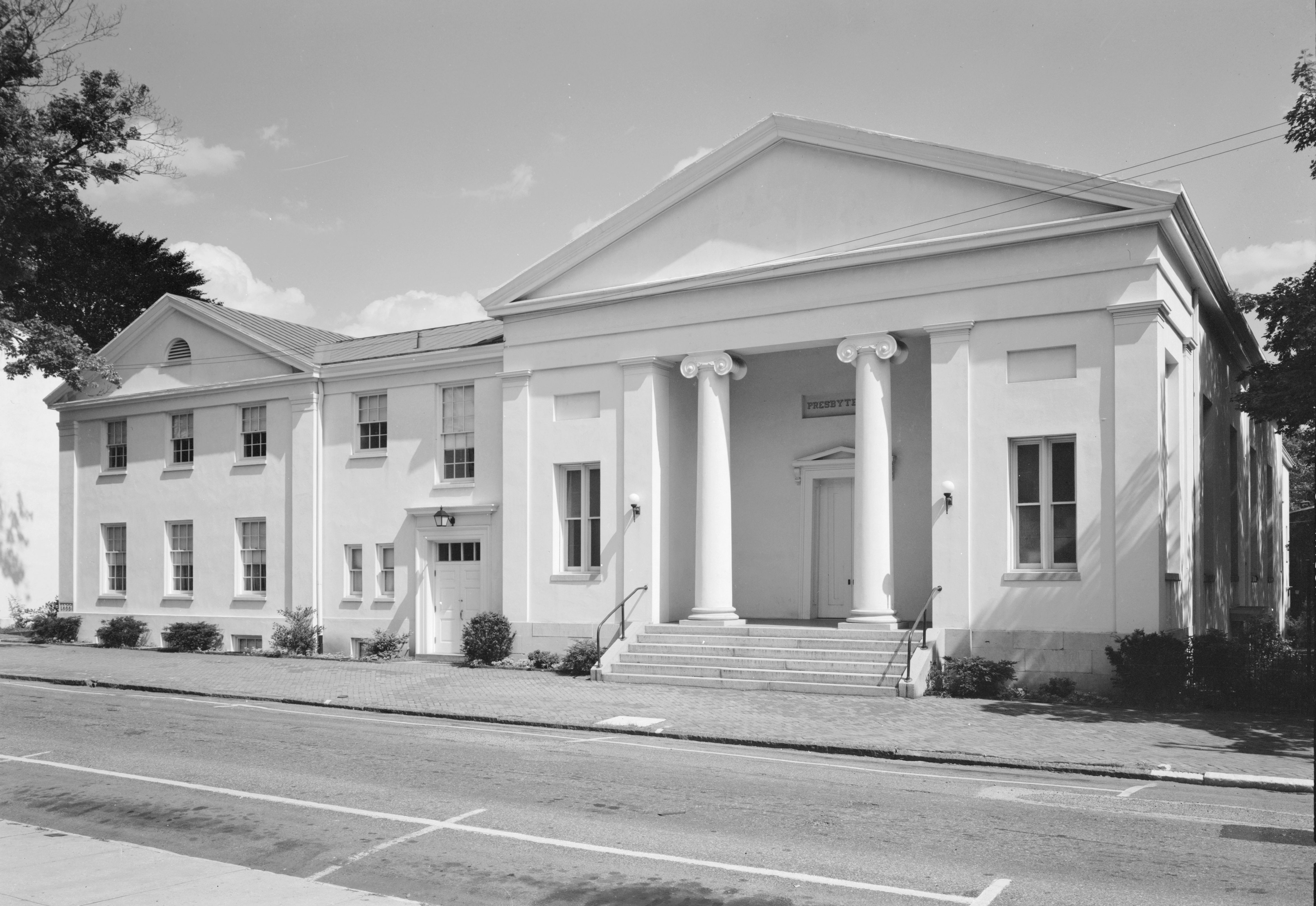
- First Presbyterian Church of West Chester, 1958

- Location within Pennsylvania Location within the United States
- Location: 130 W. Miner St., West Chester, Pennsylvania
- Coordinates: 39°57′26″N 75°36′23″W
- Area: 0.3 acres (0.12 ha)
- Built: 1832
- Architect: Walter, Thomas U.
- Architectural style: Greek Revival
- NRHP reference No.: 72001111
- Added to NRHP: November 27, 1972

First Presbyterian Church of West Chester is a historic Presbyterian church located at 130 W. Miner Street in West Chester, Chester County, Pennsylvania. It was designed in 1832 by Thomas U. Walter, who later became the fourth Architect of the Capitol. The church is a stuccoed stone building measuring 75 feet long and 45 feet wide in the Greek Revival style. Additions were built in 1860 and 1955. The front facade features a recessed porch flanked by two projections with pilasters.

It was added to the National Register of Historic Places in 1972.

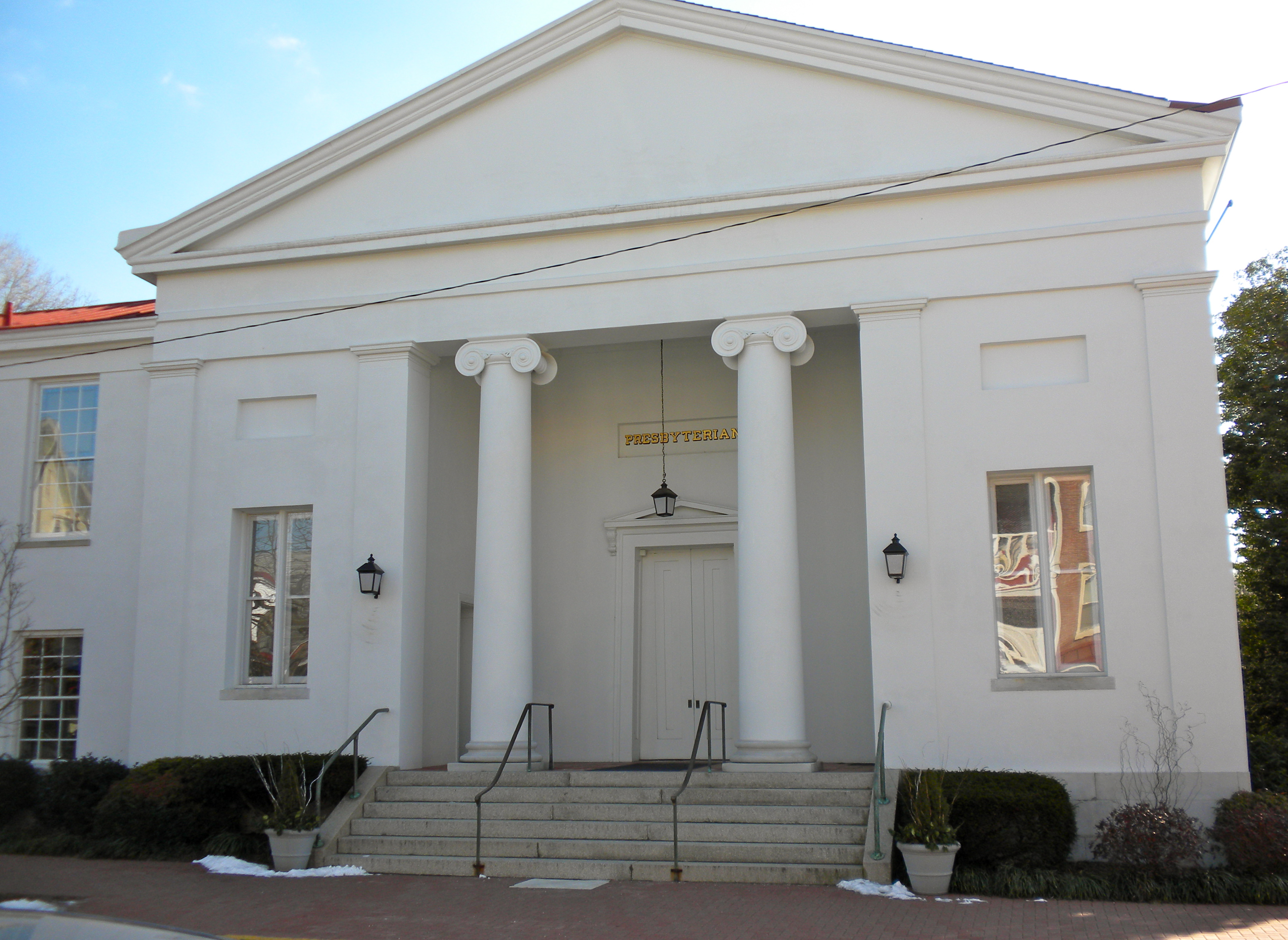
January 2010

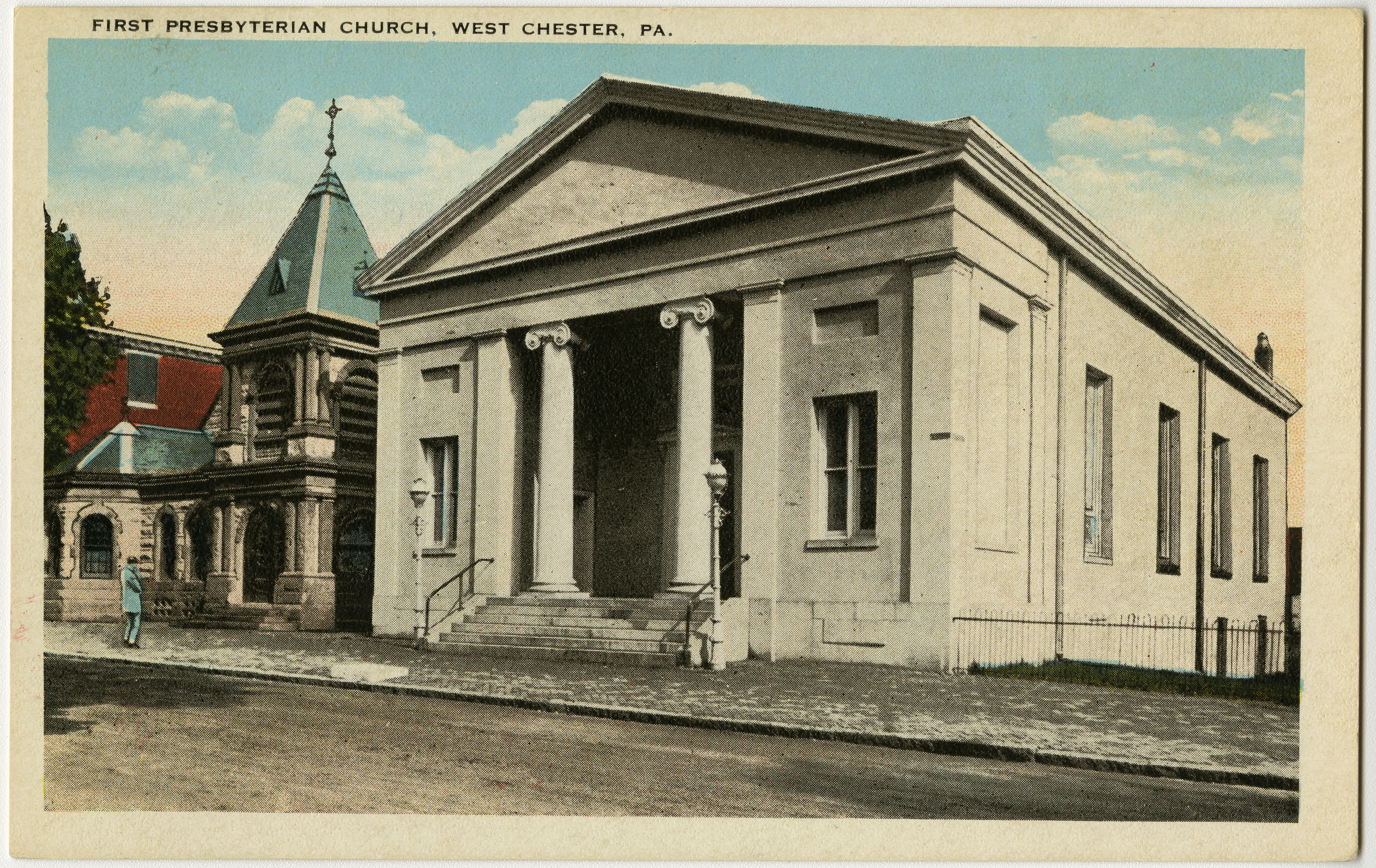
Before 1923
