= Tabb Street Presbyterian Church =

Historic church in Virginia, US

- U.S. National Register of Historic Places
- U.S. Historic district – Contributing property
- Virginia Landmarks Register
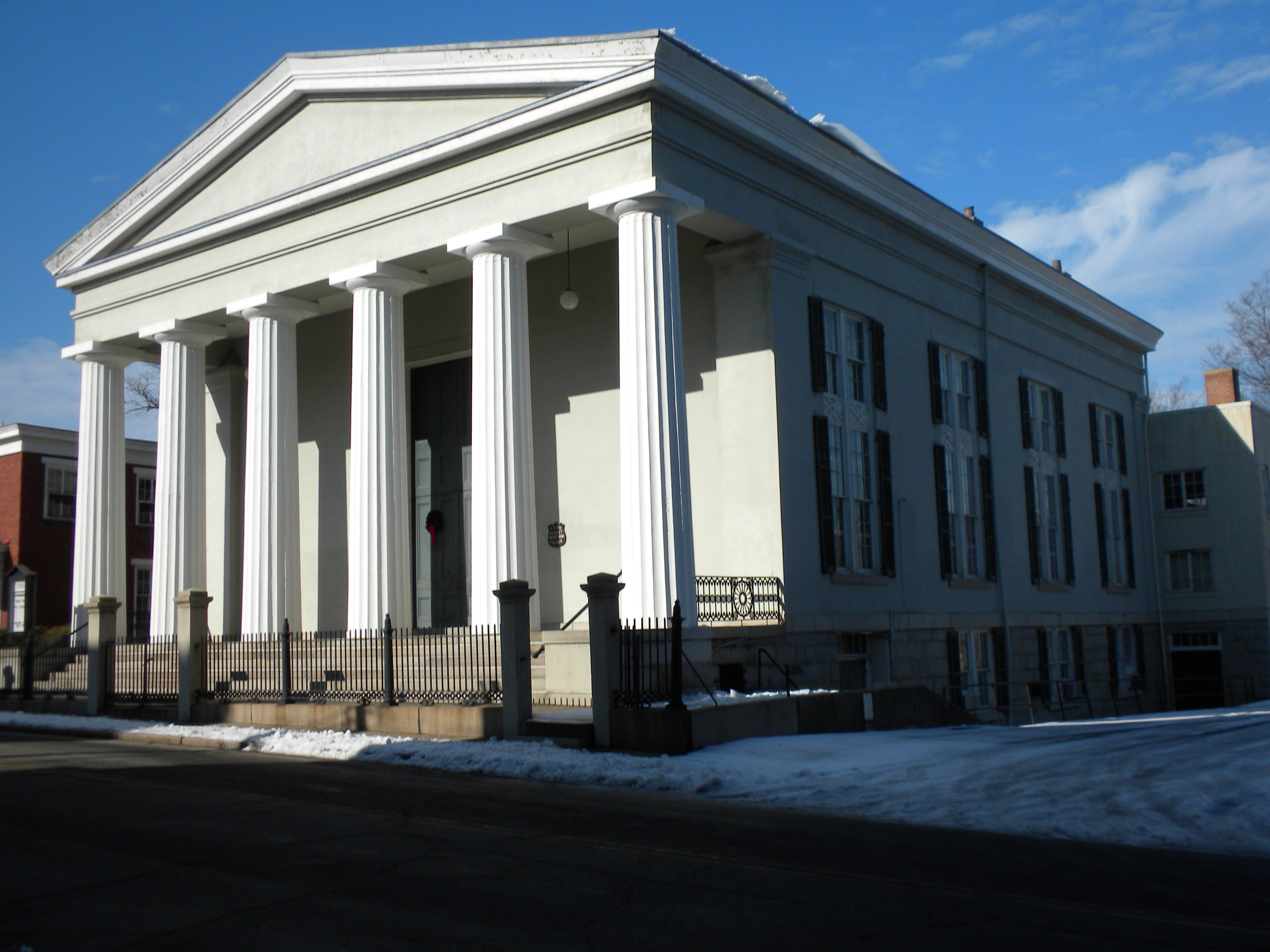
- Tabb Street Presbyterian Church, December 2009

- Location within Virginia Location within the United States
- Location: 21 W. Tabb St., Petersburg, Virginia
- Coordinates: 37°13′49″N 77°24′20″W
- Area: 1.5 acres (0.61 ha)
- Built: 1843
- Architect: Thomas Ustick Walter
- Architectural style: Greek Revival
- NRHP reference No.: 79003288
- VLR No.: 123-0043

Significant dates
- Added to NRHP: May 31, 1979
- Designated VLR: December 21, 1978

Tabb Street Presbyterian Church is a historic Presbyterian church located at Petersburg, Virginia. It was designed by architect Thomas Ustick Walter and built in 1843, in the Greek Revival style. It has stucco covered brick walls and features a massive Greek Doric order pedimented peristyle portico consisting of six fluted columns and full entablature. It has two full stories and a gallery. A three-story rear brick wing was added in 1944.

It was listed on the National Register of Historic Places in 1979. It is located in the Petersburg Courthouse Historic District.
