= The Social War =

1872 utopian novel by Simon Mohler Landis

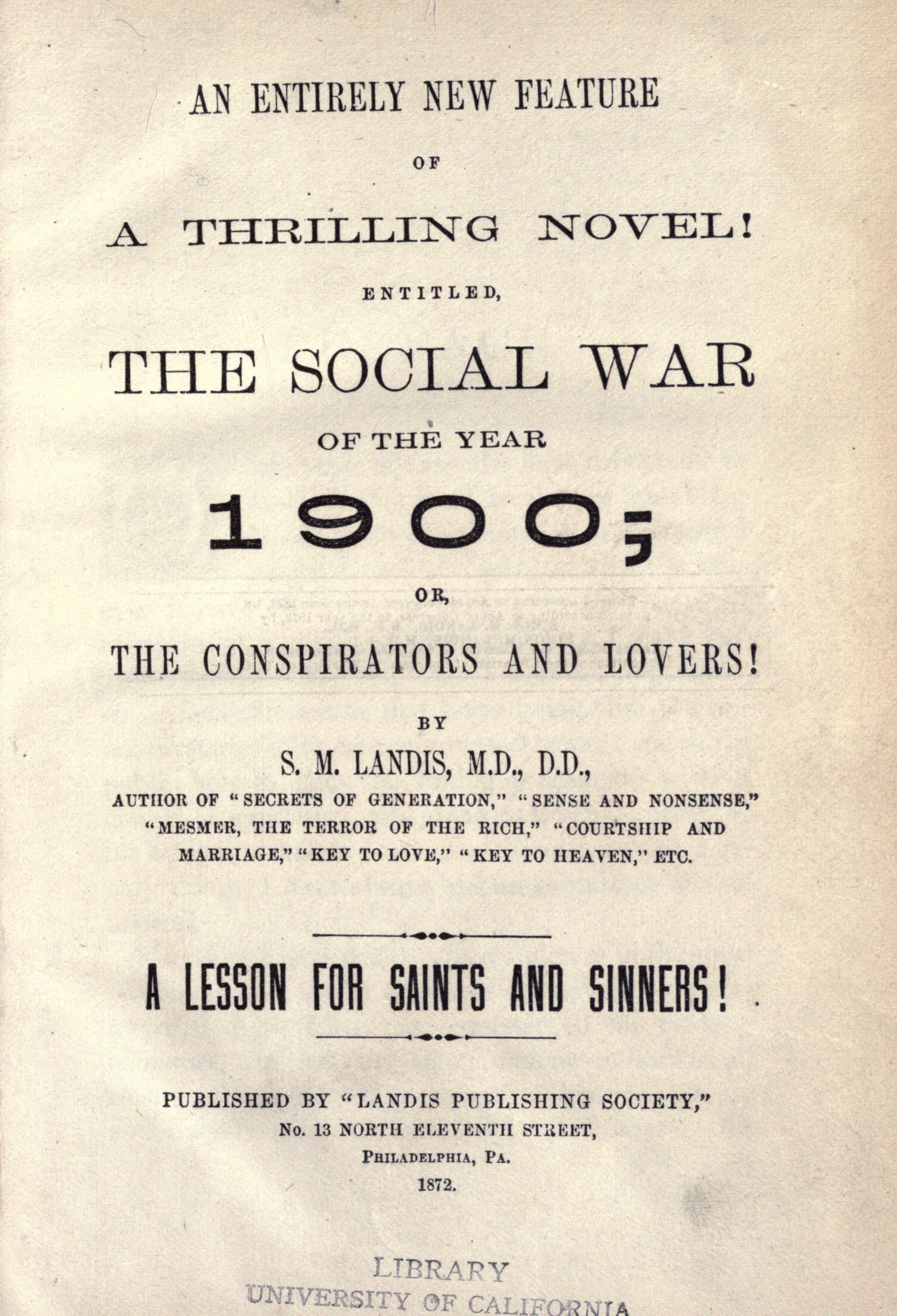
- Title page of The Social War
- Author: Simon Mohler Landis
- Language: English
- Genre: Science fiction Novel
- Publisher: Landis Publishing Society
- Publication date: 1872
- Publication place: United States
- Media type: Print
- Text: The Social War at Wikisource

An Entirely New Feature of a Thrilling Novel!: Entitled, The Social War of the Year 1900; Or, Conspirators and Lovers! is an American utopian novel by Simon Mohler Landis. Self-published in 1872 to commercial failure, it is regarded by some critics as one of the worst novels ever written.

== Plot and themes ==
Victor Juno, the novel's hero, leads the "Naturalists", a militant secret society, and as a preacher heals sickness through animal magnetism instead of medicine. He and his sweetheart Lucinda are opposed by doctors, organized religion, and an odd assortment of "Conspirators". Civil war ensues, which the Naturalists win. They shoot all prisoners of war and institute a totalitarian theocracy, decreeing that all must work on pain of death, all money is to be collected by the state, "medicines, fashions and all artificial and useless things must be abolished instantly", and so forth. God eventually approves this state of affairs by sending a plague and famine in which all the wicked perish, leaving only the Naturalists to exult in "the work of God and man".

The Social War of the Year 1900 combines, according to E. F. Bleiler's review in Science-fiction, the early years, "lurid sensationalism and sexual elements with a nasty messianic urge", thereby continuing the American Gothic tradition of George Lippard. Its plot consists of "a repetition of the same incident over and over, the kidnapping and physical abuse of the hero and heroine".

== Author ==
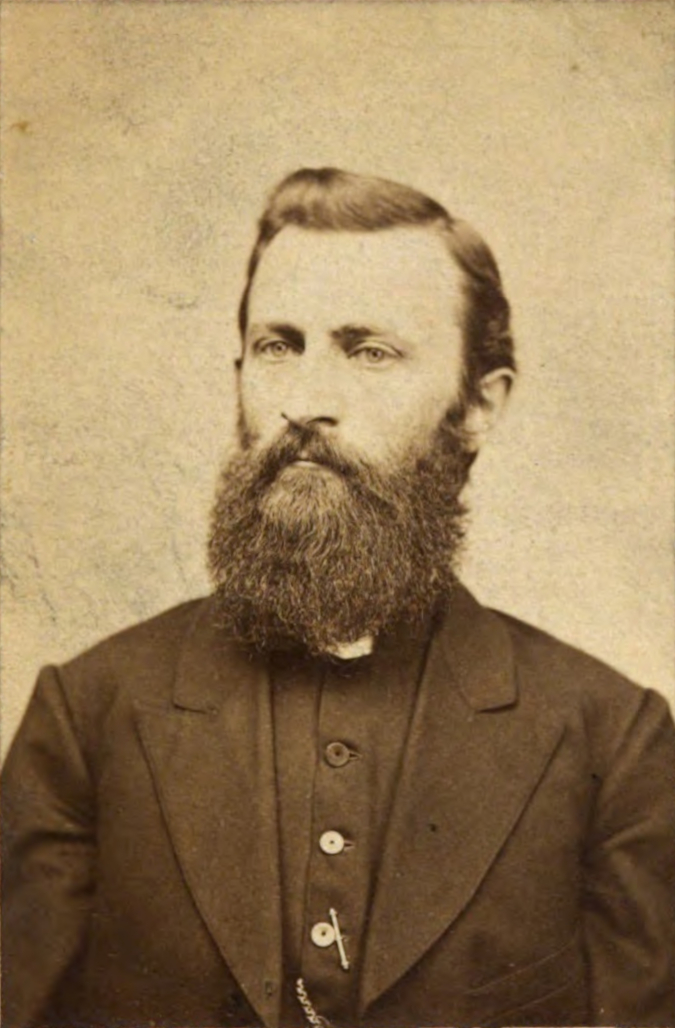
Simon M. Landis, c. 1870

Simon Mohler Landis (June 4, 1829 – December 25, 1902) was a clergyman and hydropath from Pennsylvania, pastor of the "First Progressive Church of Philadelphia" which he founded in 1865. Frequently bankrupt, he made a living through lectures and by selling inventions such as the "Patent Compound Male and Female Magnitude Syringe and Organic Bath". He styled himself a doctor, although there is no evidence that he ever received this academic degree.

The Social War of the Year 1900 is his only novel, for which he credited himself as "S.M. Landis, M.D., D.D." He also wrote several plays and medical texts, including a sexual education book, A Strictly Private Book on Marriage: Secrets of Generation (1870). On account of this he was prosecuted for obscenity and sentenced to one year of imprisonment at Moyamensing Prison, but was pardoned by Governor John W. Geary 117 days into his sentence. He recounted this trial in Prison Life Thoughts (1872) and remonstrated in publications against self-abuse, free love and doctors.

== Reception ==
Judging by the few printed copies that remain, The Social War of the Year 1900 did not sell well. Landis adapted the novel into a five-act play in 1873, but there is no record that it was ever performed.

Reviewing the novel in 2012 in io9, Jess Nevins characterized the work as "the worst science fiction novel of the 19th century", surpassing all other bad science fiction of that time in its "unreadability, cliché, and thematic foulness". E. F. Bleiler, after summarizing the novel's plot, merely asks: "Is comment necessary?"
