= Moyamensing Prison =

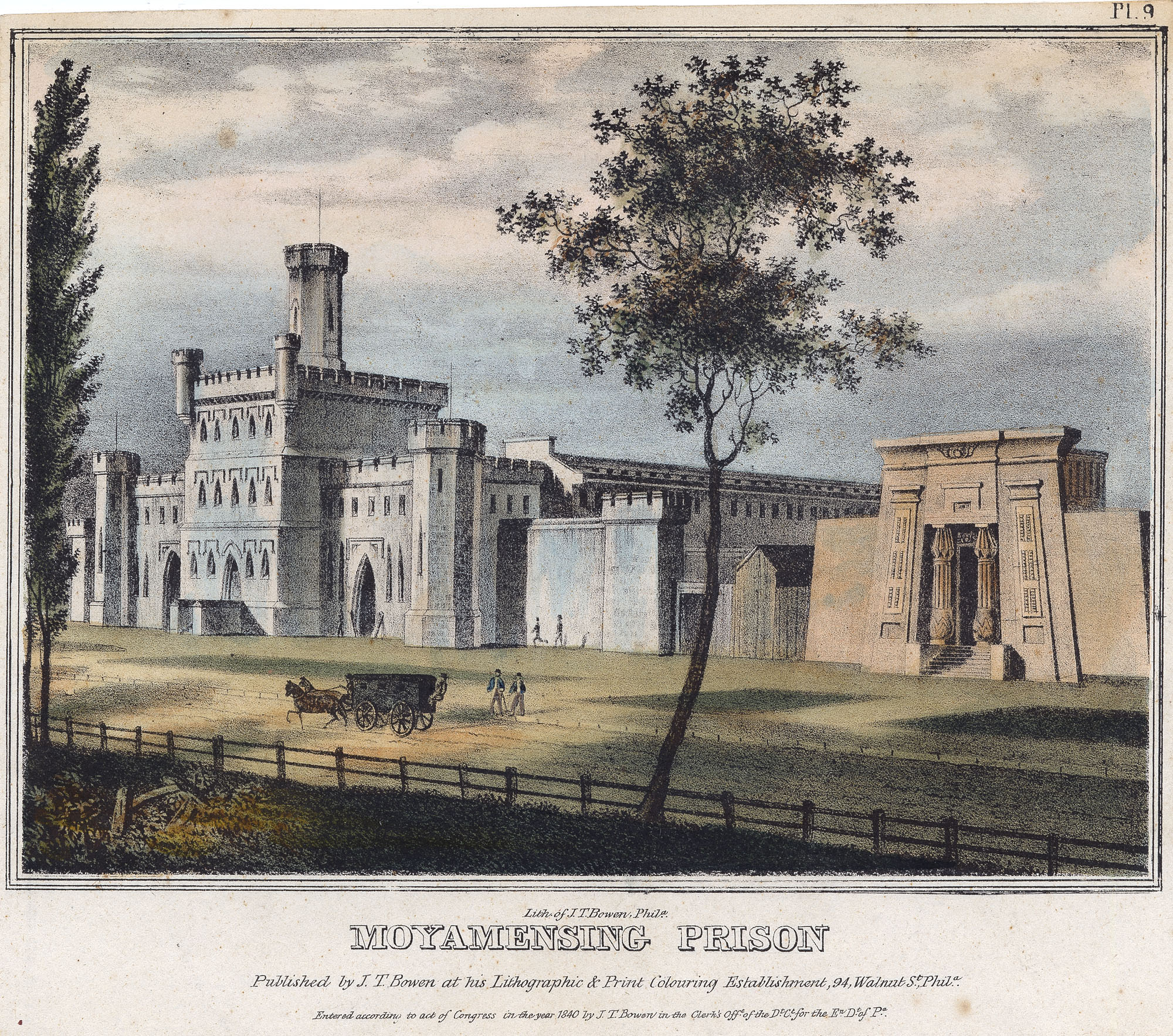
- 1838 engraving of the prison
- Alternative names: Philadelphia County Prison, "11 Street Dock," "The Jug," "The County Hotel"

General information
- Type: Prison
- Architectural style: English Gothic
- Location: 1400 East Passyunk Avenue, Philadelphia, Pennsylvania, United States of America
- Coordinates: 39.931944°N 75.161194°W
- Named for: Delaware languages for "place of judgement"
- Construction started: 1832, 1836, 1837
- Completed: 1835, 1836, 1838
- Opened: 1835
- Inaugurated: October 19, 1835
- Closed: 1963
- Demolished: 1968
- Cost: US$ 450,000

Design and construction
- Architect: Thomas Ustick Walter
- Main contractor: Thomas Ustick Walter

Moyamensing Prison was a prison in the South Philadelphia neighborhood of Philadelphia, Pennsylvania. It was designed by Thomas Ustick Walter. Its cornerstone was laid on April 2, 1832; it opened on October 19, 1835, was in use until 1963, and was demolished in 1968. For nearly 140 years the Moyamensing Prison dominated the southwest corner of the intersection of Passyunk Avenue and Reed Street in South Philadelphia.

== History ==
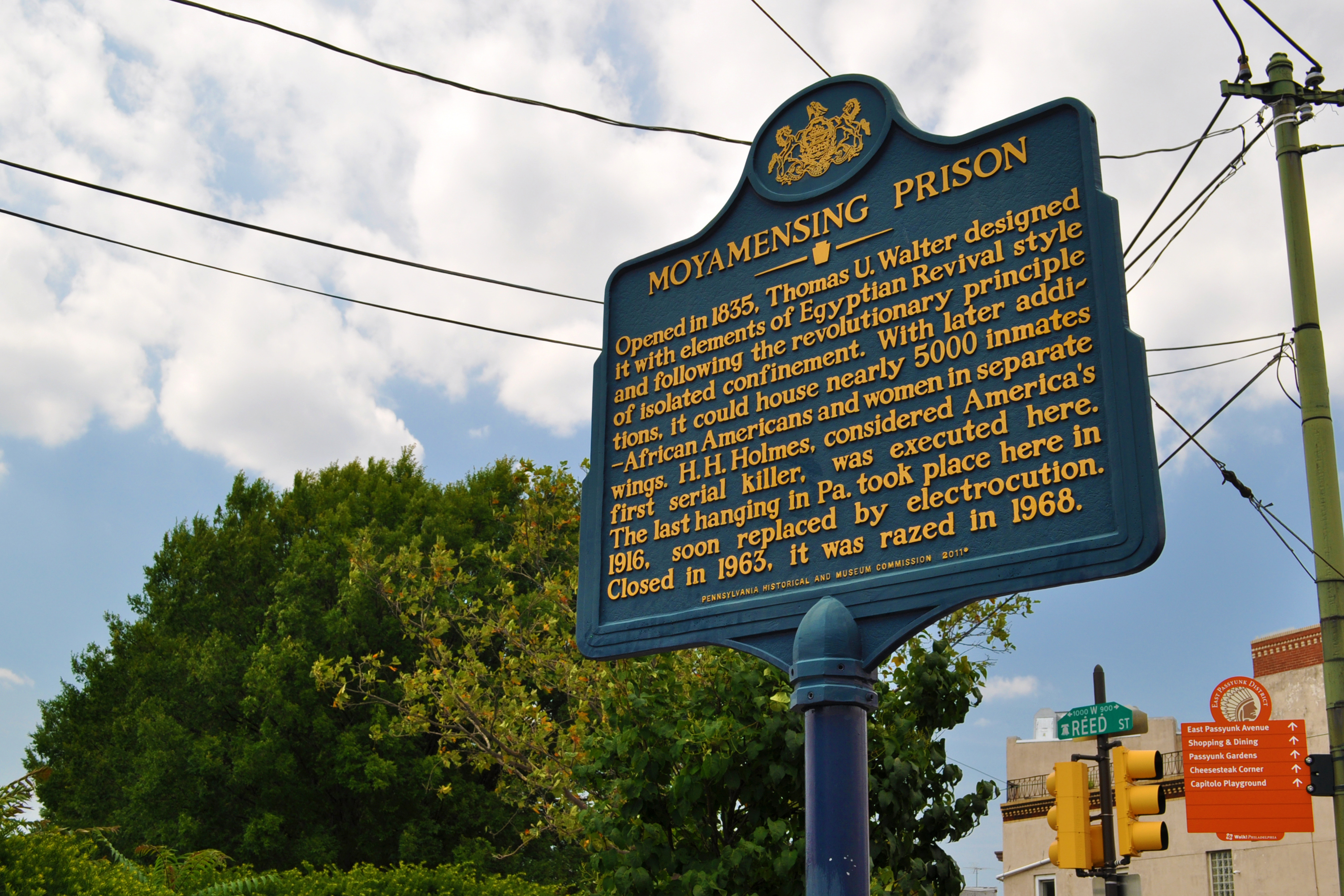
Moyamensing Prison Historical Marker

In 1831, the General Assembly of the Commonwealth of Pennsylvania authorized the erection of a facility to be called the prison of the city and county of Philadelphia. In published reports of the Board of Inspectors, it was listed as the Philadelphia County Prison, but was generally referred to by its location, which was about a mile south of the line of the city proper, in what was then Moyamensing Township, as the Moyamensing Prison, and as the New County Prison in some architectural plans.

Moyamensing Prison originally comprised three separate facilities. The County Prison was the first to be built, founded in 1832 and finished in 1835. One of the additions to its north was what was originally called the “debtor's apartment”, or Debtor's Wing, and later the “apartment for females” (prison for females), founded in 1835 and finished in 1836. West of that was the structure originally called the “vagrant's apartment”, before also being called “apartment for females”, founded in 1837 and finished in 1838. Though originally attached to about 16 acres (6.5 ha) of land, the prison itself occupied a space of 310 feet (94 m) in front by 525 feet (160 m) in depth, and its additions to the north of 150 feet (46 m) in front. Eventually the complex was relegated to little more than its footprint.

== Architecture and design ==
Philadelphia architect Thomas U. Walter designed all three sections of the complex and was the primary contractor on the two later projects. He also designed extensions in 1870, but they were never executed. Walter is also well known for his later design of the dome of the United States Capitol, the United States Senate and United States House of Representatives wings of the Capitol as they exist today.

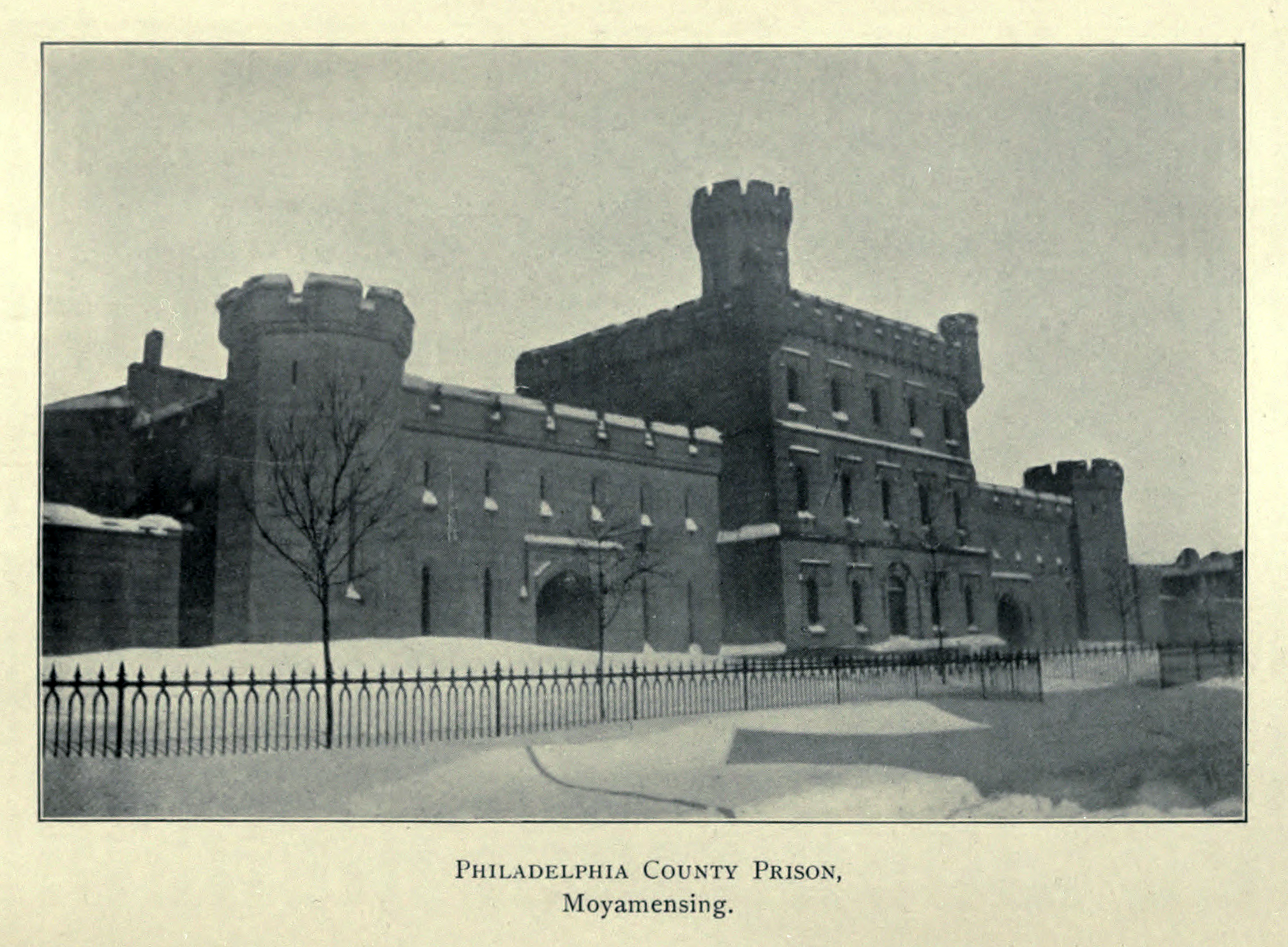
Moyamensing Prison in a 1901 photo

The facade of the prison consisted of a central building of 53 feet (16 m) in width, with receding wings on either side of 50 feet (15 m), flanked by massive octagonal towers. Beyond these towers, receding wing-walls were continued to the extremities of the front, and terminated with embattled bastions.

The whole exterior was composed of a blue syenite, obtained from Quincy, Massachusetts. The style of architecture is that of the castles of the Middle Ages, and its decorations are in the perpendicular or Tudor style of English Gothic.

The center building was three stories in height, diminishing at each story in regular offsets, capped with projecting belts. The corners were finished with circular warder towers of 5 feet 4 inches (1.63 m) in diameter, commencing at 10 feet (3.0 m) below the top of the front wall, and extending 5 feet (1.5 m) above it; these towers projected three-fourths of their circumference over the corners of the building, and were crowned with embattled parapets, supported by corbels. The front wall and both the flanks were also finished with battlements, pierced with embrasures, forming an embattled screen between the towers.

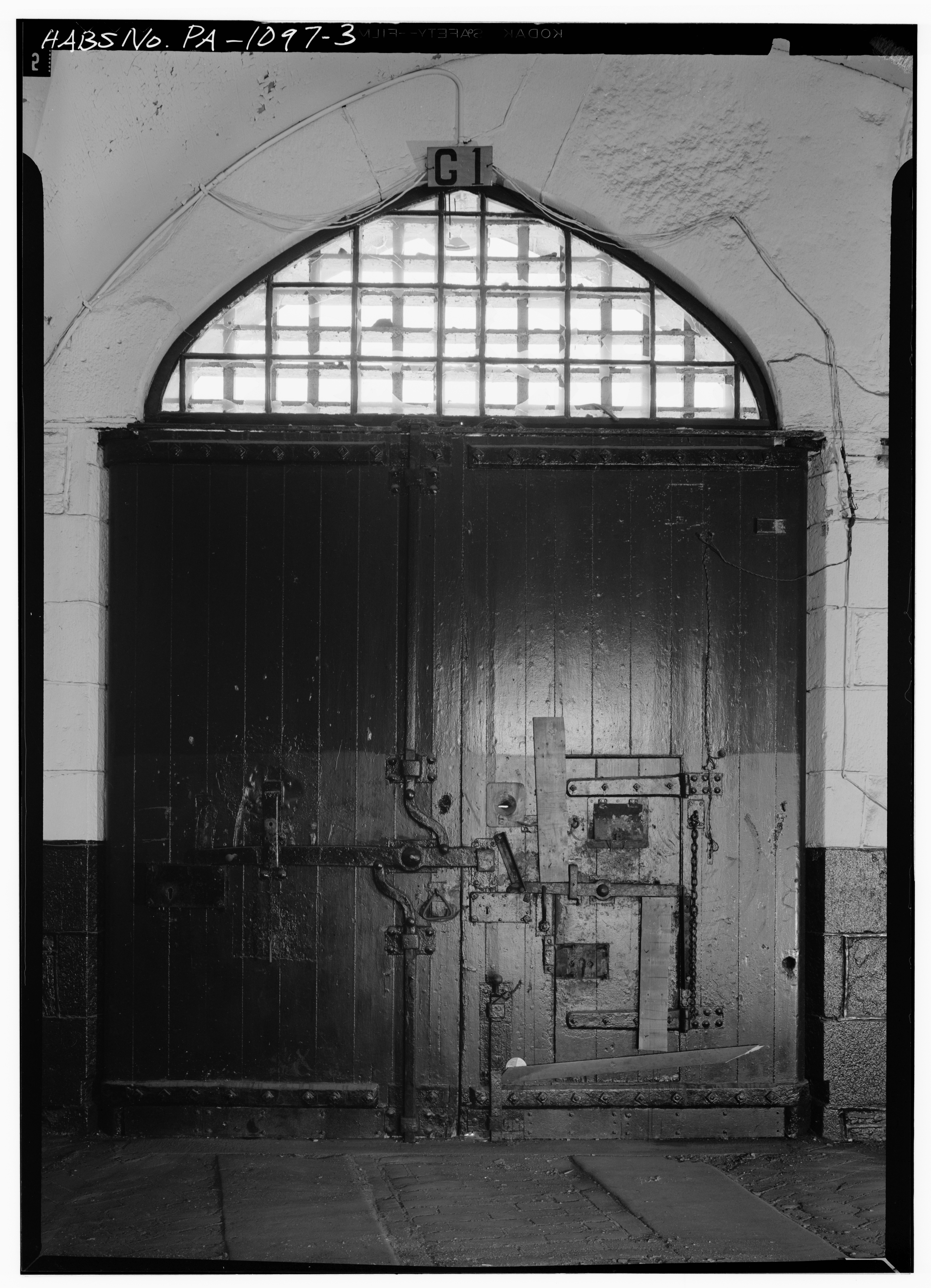
Gate of Entrance

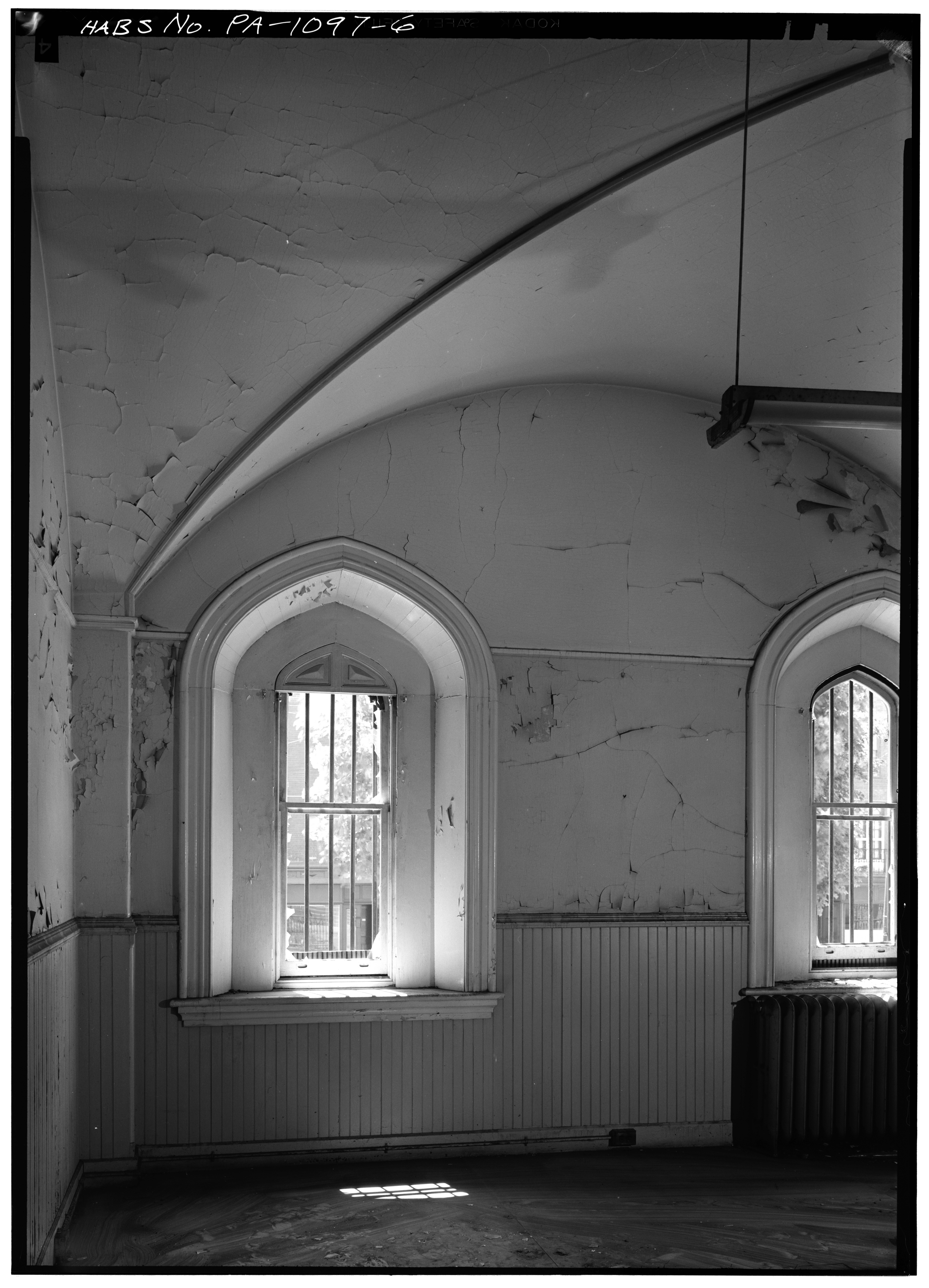
Windows

The wings were two stories in height and contained the gates of the entrance, each of which was 10 feet (3.0 m) wide and 17 feet (5.2 m) high. These wings were pierced with slip windows, and finished with embattled parapets, in the same manner as the center building.

The octagonal towers which flanked the wings, and the bastions on the extreme angles of the front, were likewise crowned with pierced battlements corresponding with the rest of the design. The bastions projected 2 feet (0.61 m) from the wing walls, and measured, on each face, 15 feet (4.6 m) in width at the base, and 13 feet (4.0 m) at the top.

The center building was surmounted by an embattled octagonal tower, which rose to the height of 77 feet (23 m) from the ground.

The interior was disposed of in two general divisions, one for untried prisoners and the other for male convicts; the female convicts being confined in a building on the adjoining lot, which will subsequently be described.

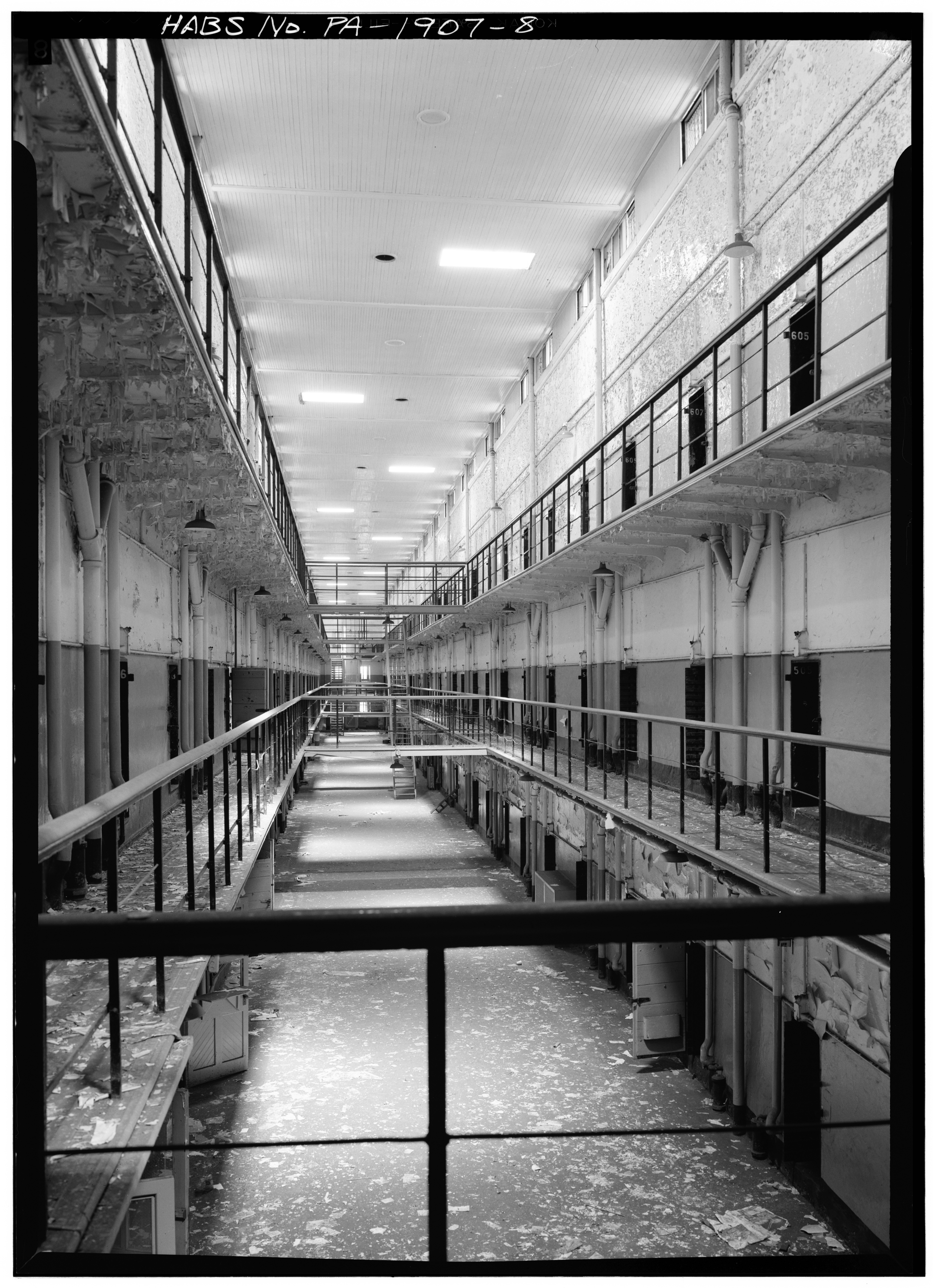

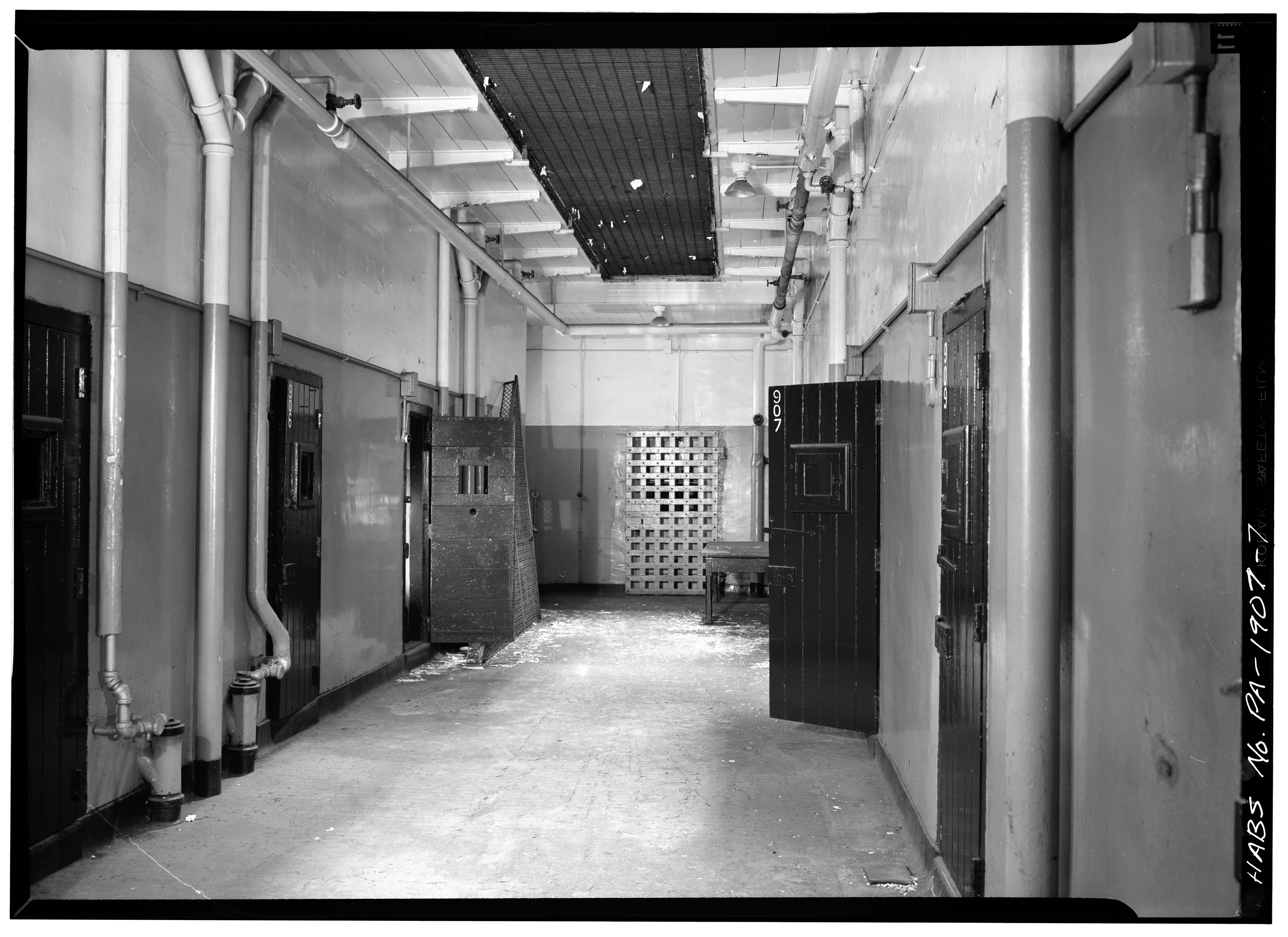

The main prison contained 408 separate cells, built in two blocks of three stories in height, extending from each wing at right angles with the principal front. The cells opened into a corridor of 20 feet (6.1 m) in width, occupying the center of each block and extending the whole length and height of the building. The second and third stories were approached utilizing granite stairways leading to galleries, supported by cast iron brackets. A clerk's office was situated at the head of each corridor, from which every cell door may be seen throughout the whole range.

Each cell was 9 feet (2.7 m) wide, 13 feet (4.0 m) long, and 9 feet (2.7 m) high, arched with bricks, and floored with oak planks. The cells were all furnished with separate hydrants, water closets, flues for ventilation, flues for the admission of fresh air, and flues for admitting warm air, generated by furnaces placed in the cellar of the building. The hydrants and water closets were supplied from the works at Fairmount.

The furnaces were constructed at each end, and in the center of each block, and the warm air was conveyed along passages of 3 feet (0.91 m) in width, under the pavement of the corridor. The smoke flues were formed in these passages, the bottom and sides of them being composed of bricks, and the top of cast iron plates; these flues extended horizontally from the main furnaces at each end, to the center, where they rose perpendicularly to the top of the building; an ascending current was produced in the vertical portion of each flue by means of small furnaces constructed in the center, and which were also made to impart heat to the cells adjacent to them; forming an active current in the horizontal flues to convey heat along the whole range in sufficient quantities to keep all the cells of an agreeable temperature.

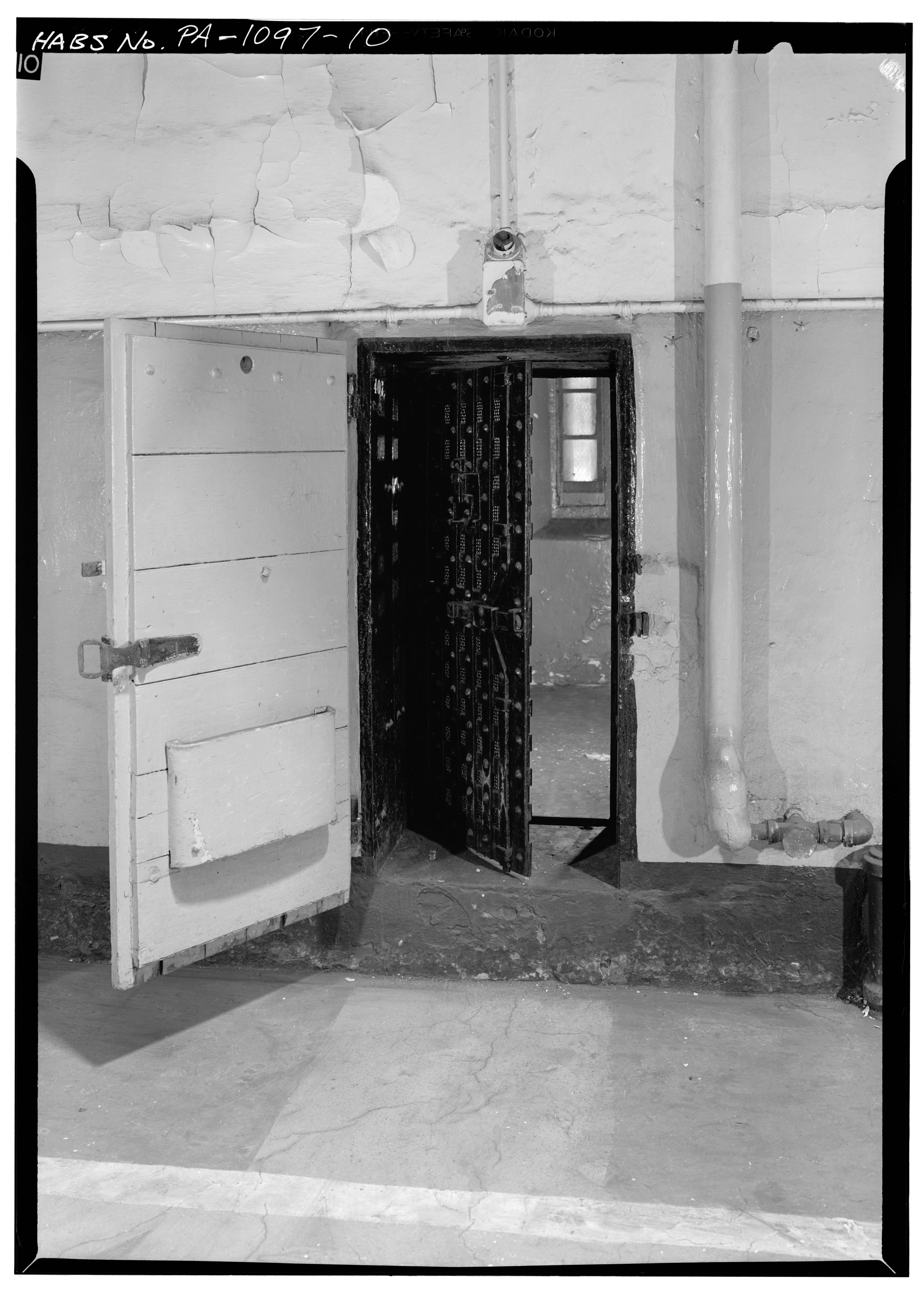
Cell Door with Open Metal Lattice Door

Each cell had a wooden door on the outside face of the wall, and an iron one on the inside; both doors were secured to a cast iron casing or frame, which extended through the whole thickness of the wall.

The kitchen, bakehouse, laundry, and bathhouses were situated in a separate building, occupying a space of 43 by 72 feet (13 by 22 m), in the yard between the two blocks of cells; they were approached from both divisions of the prison, by means of covered passages. The kitchen was furnished with a steam boiler, and four cast-iron reservoirs, of 80 US gallons (300 L; 67 imp gal) each, in which all the boiling from prisoners was done by steam.

The apartment for females was situated on an adjoining enclosure, of 150 by 340 feet (46 by 104 m), entered by a gateway from the yard of the main prison. The building measured 43 by 282 feet (13 by 86 m) and consisted of two stories in height, embracing 100 separate cells of 8 by 12 feet (2.4 by 3.7 m), a suite of rooms for an infirmary of 20 by 51 feet (6.1 by 15.5 m), and two rooms for a keeper, each 20 by 20 feet (6.1 by 6.1 m). The arrangements for hydrants, water closets, warming and ventilation, were similar to those described above.

The principal entrance to this portion of the establishment was from what was then Eleventh (now Reed) Street; it consisted of a gateway of 9 feet (2.7 m) in width, placed in the middle of a projecting center of 50 feet (15 m), composed of brown sandstone, finished in the Egyptian style of architecture. The whole western front was built of the same material and in the same style.

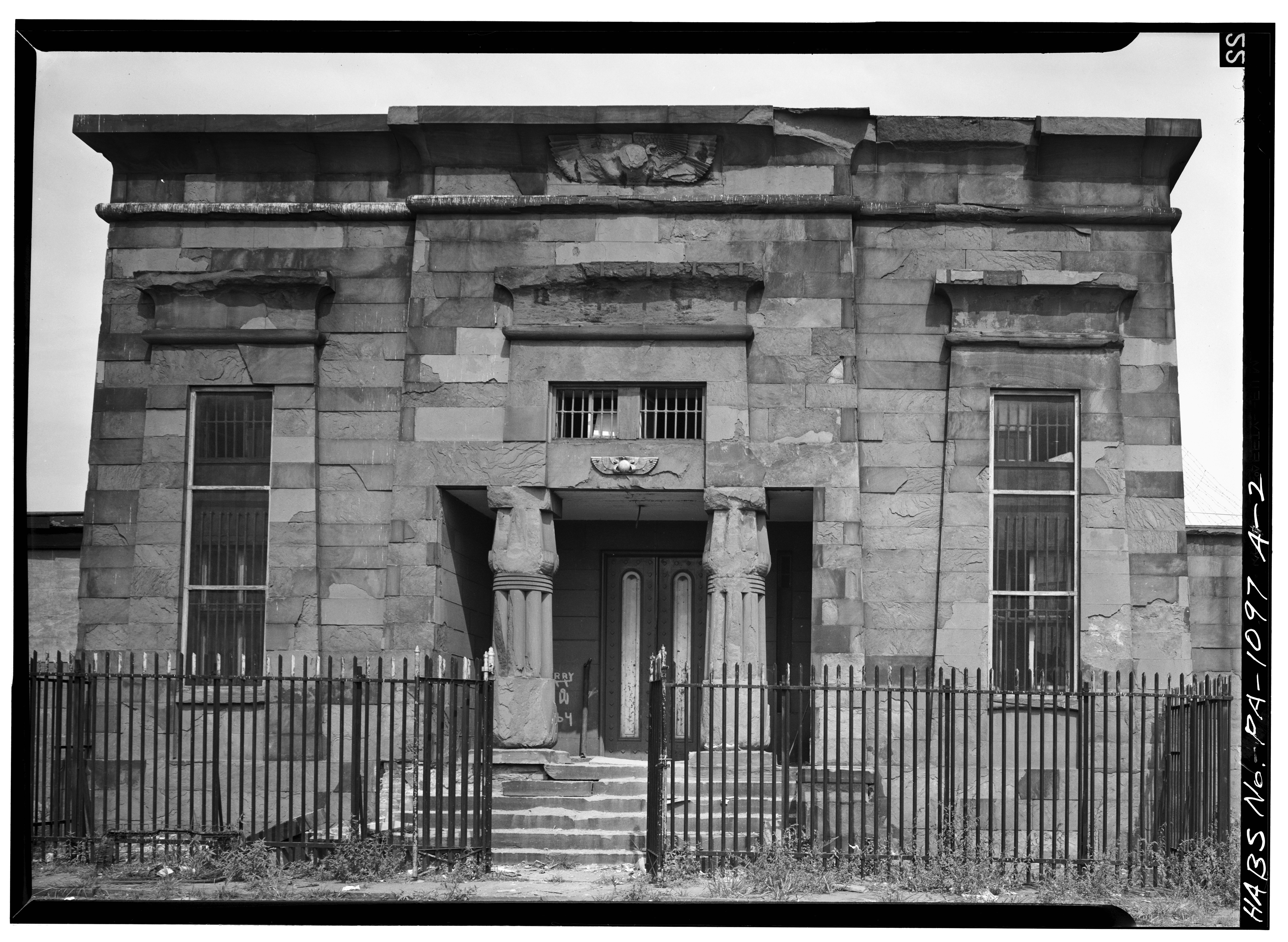
Debtor's Wing, 1965

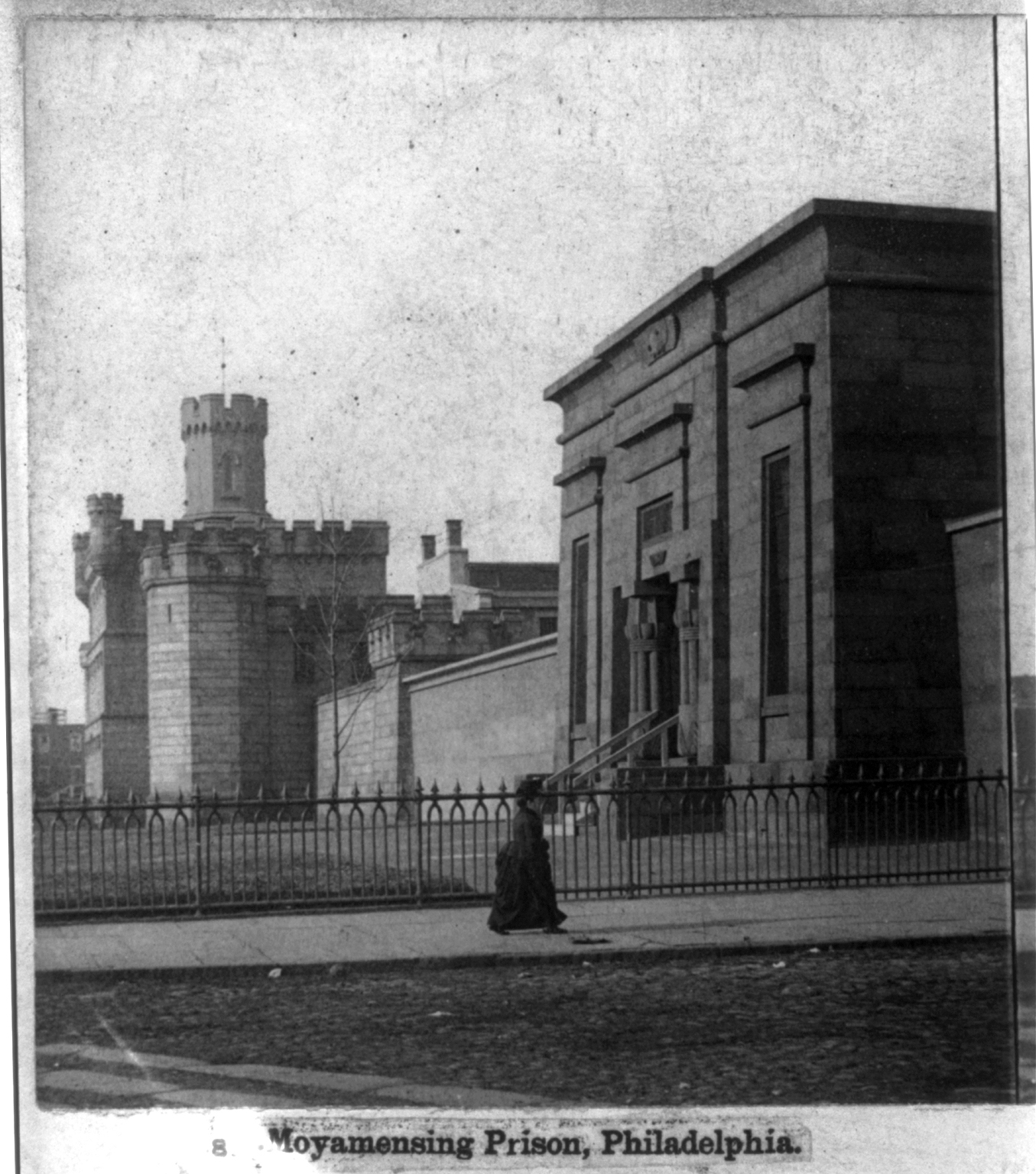

The Debtor's Apartment, or Debtor's Wing, was situated on Passyunk Avenue, north of the main prison, and east of the female apartment. The interior featured two stories on a raised basement, with a central longitudinal corridor floor plan with flanking prison cells. Measuring 50 feet 1/2 inch (15.253 m) by 86 feet 2 inches (26.26 m), the exterior was composed of brown sandstone, in the Egyptian style of architecture. The façade consisted of a recessed three-bay portico, supported by two columns, and was proportioned from those of a temple on the Isle d'Elephantine in Egypt. The windows were crowned with the massy bead and cavetto cornice peculiar to the style, and the top of the building was finished in the same manner. A winged globe was carved in the cavetto of the main cornice, and a similar ornament is introduced over the door.

The prison complex was demolished in 1968, and the front portico of the Debtor's Wing is in the possession of the Smithsonian Institution, Washington, D.C. Today, all that is left is a low heavy masonry stone wall remaining on the site along Reed Street where the Acme Market shopping center sits today. The wall remnants were designated for inclusion in the Philadelphia Register of Historic Places in January 2019.

== Famous prisoners ==
Tom Hyer, reigning American bare knuckle heavyweight champion, was briefly held at Moyamensing while waiting for a requisition from the Governor of Maryland prosecuting him for an illegal but well-attended and highly publicized prize fight against Irish boxer Yankee Sullivan on February 7, 1849.

On July 1, 1849, when Edgar Allan Poe was in Philadelphia, he drank, became drunk and hallucinatory, and made a suicide attempt. He was detained for public drunkenness and incarcerated for one night in Moyamensing Prison. No records exist which support this story other than Poe's own account of it.

While imprisoned here in 1855, abolitionist Passmore Williamson became a focus of the press, as northern publications spread his story throughout the country. Friends comfortably furnished his cell, and he received letters and several hundred visitors including both Frederick Douglass and Harriet Tubman.

One of America's first serial killers, H. H. Holmes, was incarcerated at Moyamensing Prison in 1895. While there, he wrote a memoir called Holmes' Own Story which included his Moyamensing Prison diary. He also wrote a confession to twenty-seven murders that was publicized in The Philadelphia Inquirer. Holmes was hanged at the prison on May 7, 1896. Holmes's neck did not snap immediately; he instead died slowly, twitching over fifteen minutes before being pronounced dead twenty minutes after the trap was sprung.

== General references ==
- "First Annual Report of the Inspectors of the Philadelphia County Prison". November 27, 1847. pp. 8–10.
- Moyamensing Prison data from the Philadelphia Architects and Buildings (PAB) project of the Athenaeum of Philadelphia
- Historic American Buildings Survey (HABS) documentation, filed under Philadelphia, Philadelphia County, PA:
  - HABS No. PA-1097, "Philadelphia County Prison, Tenth Street", 10 photos, 2 data pages, 1 photo caption page
  - HABS No. PA-1097-A, "Philadelphia County Prison, Debtors' Wing, Reed Street and Passyunk Avenue", 5 photos, 7 measured drawings, 2 data pages, 1 photo caption page
