= New Zealand Air Training Corps =

- Active: 1941–present
- Country: New Zealand
- Allegiance: HM The King
- Branch: Aviation
- Type: Volunteer Youth Organisation
- Size: (As of 31 March 2025); 47 Squadrons: 2441 Cadets; 194 Commissioned Officers; 71 Officer Cadets; 104 Supplementary Staff
- Part of: New Zealand Cadet Forces
- Headquarters: Trentham Military Camp
- Nicknames: ATC; Air Cadets; Blue Cadets
- Motto: "We Train to Serve"
- Website: www.cadetforces.org.nz

Commanders
- Minister of Defence: Hon Judith Collins
- Chief of the Defence Force: Air Marshal Tony Davies
- Commandant NZCF: Wing Commander Bruce Creedy, RNZAF
- Executive Officer NZCF: Squadron Leader Bruce Sinclair, RNZAF
- Assistant Commandant: Wing Commander Shane Cole, NZBM QSM NZCF
- Warrant Officer Cadet Forces: Warrant Officer Cadet Alexandria Waugh

Insignia
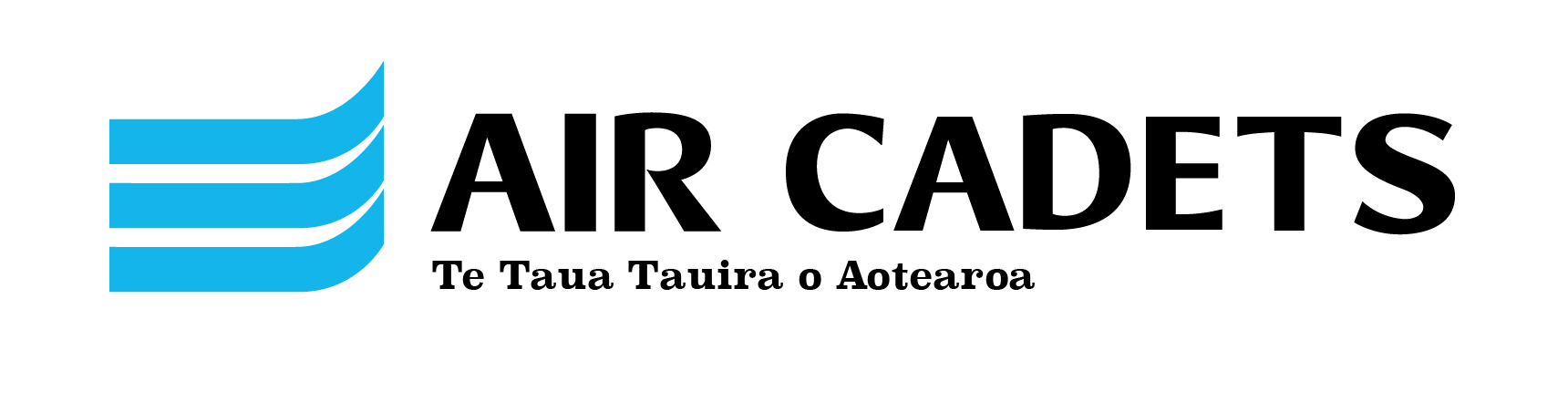
- Air Cadet Logo

The New Zealand Air Training Corps (also known as Air Cadets and ATC) is one of the three corps in the New Zealand Cadet Forces (NZCF), alongside the New Zealand Sea Cadet Corps and the New Zealand Cadet Corps. It is funded in partnership between the Royal New Zealand Air Force (RNZAF) and local communities. Members are civilians with no obligation to enlist in the New Zealand Defence Force (NZDF). Should a cadet enlist, their service in the ATC cadet does not translate into higher pay, rank, or seniority.

The ATC's mission is to develop and enable self-disciplined, confident and responsible young people, with a vision to prepare New Zealand's successful leaders of tomorrow. in March 2025 the Air Training Corps has 2810 personnel

== History ==
=== British roots ===
In the late 1930s, with the increase of military aircraft technology and the decrease of war-time resources, the Royal Air Force (RAF) struggled to find sufficient numbers of suitable recruits. To overcome this problem, the Air League of the British Empire launched its Air Defence Cadet Corps in 1938, replaced by the Air Training Corps in February 1941. It ran in schools with the aim to train boys aged 16–17.5 so they could enter the RAF at the age of 18 without needing to complete basic training.

=== Foundation and World War II ===
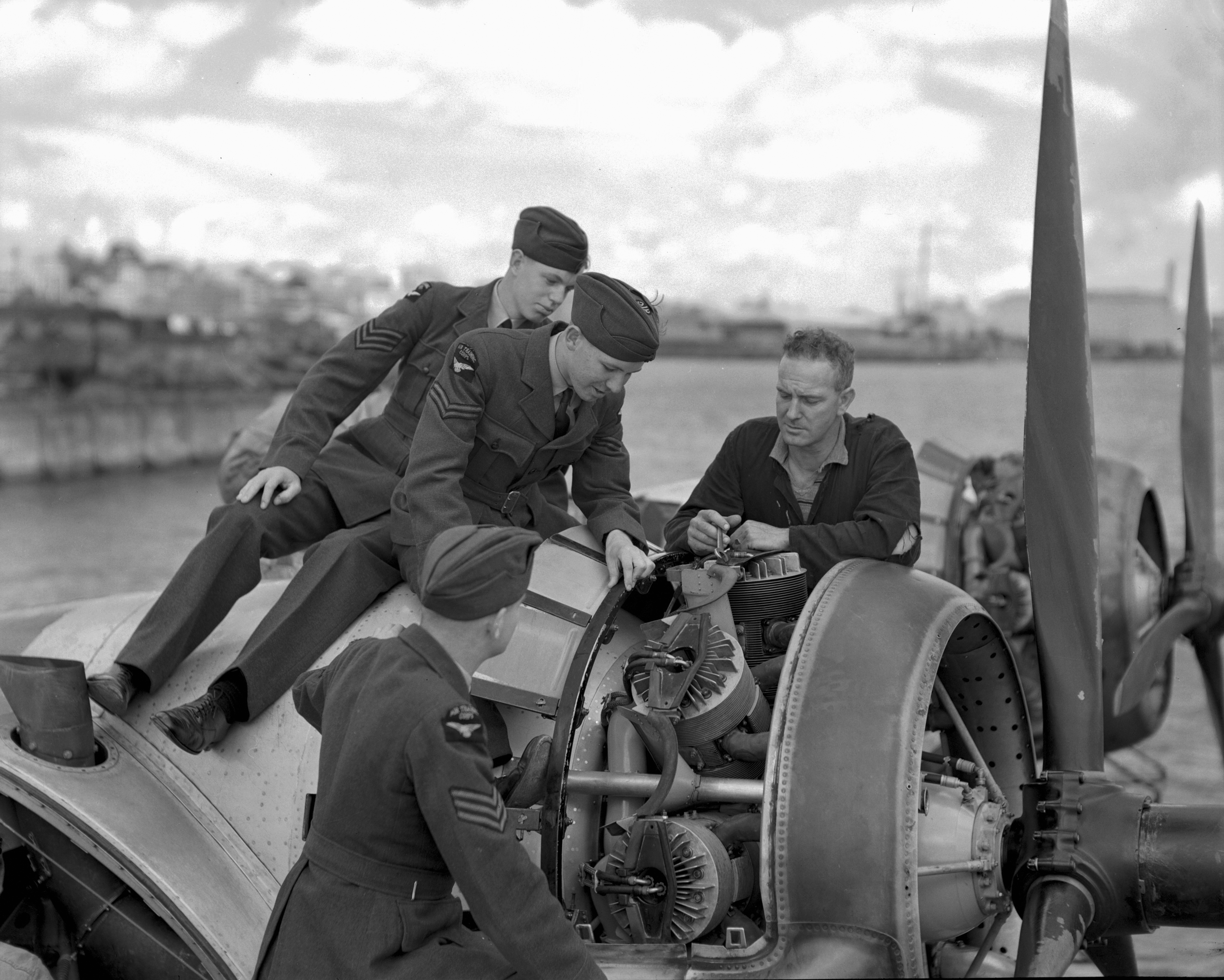
Cadets looking at an engine of an Empire Flying Boat.

The first proposal for an Air Corps in New Zealand came in August 1940 from Lord Galway. Early the following year, a review of aircrew requirements found that there would be difficulty obtaining sufficient recruits by the end of 1942. Authority was given by War Cabinet in February 1941 to form an Air Cadet Training Corps, the name subsequently being standardised as Air Training Corps (ATC). 'Town', 'School' and 'Country' units were set up in major cities, training young men between 16.5 and 18 years of age. The first squadron was No 1 SQN in Wellington and No 2 SQN in Petone, both formed at the same time.

With New Zealand considered to be at risk from Japanese invasion and the British not in a position to help, the ATC's purpose was to prepare potential airmen to join the RNZAF when they came of age by training them in basic airmanship and providing an insight into Air Force work. The ATC peaked during World War II at approximately 9200 cadets, and provided 3500 recruits to the RNZAF. By the end of the war, unit numbers had risen to 105 town units and 64 school units, but when the war ended in August 1945 unit and cadet numbers began to decline.

=== Post World War II and compulsory military training ===
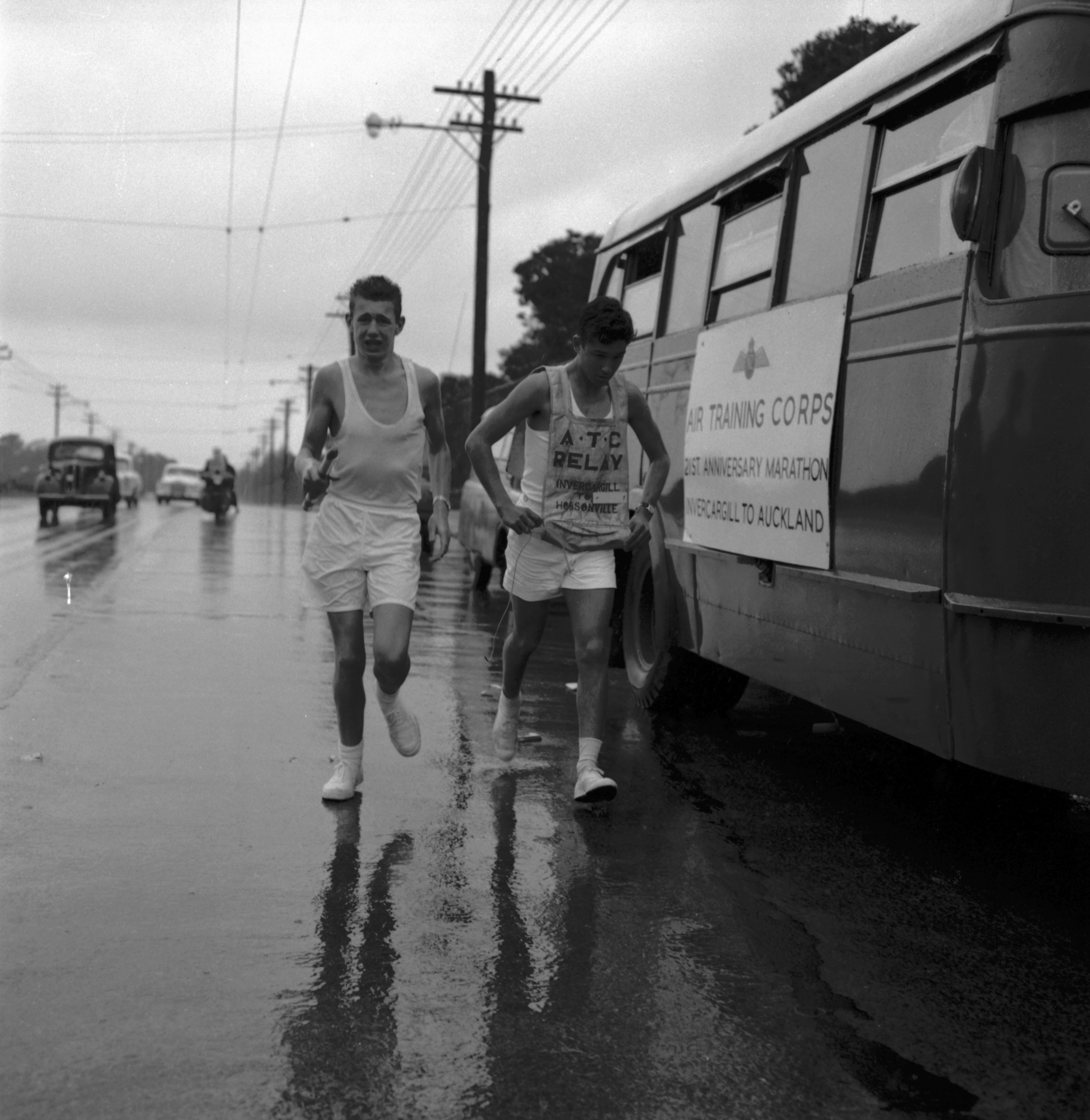
Two Cadets running past an RNZAF bus in an Auckland street. 21st Anniversary

The introduction of compulsory military training brought a period of crisis for the ATC. If the RNZAF could get sufficient recruits from conscripted trainees there would be little need for an ATC. Premises were in poor shape, equipment was short, and there was a serious shortage of instructors. It was decided that the ATC lacked good officers, and that the regular force provided insufficient assistance. Steps were taken to improve the ATC by reducing the lower age limit to 15 years, closing some smaller units and holding a refresher course for instructors.

Compulsory military training was abolished in 1958 and replaced by a ballot system of conscripted service for randomly selected 20-year-old males, which operated between 1960 and 1970. By 1964 the Combined Cadet Forces reached a peak strength of 198 units, with 1000 officers and about 56,000 cadets.

In 1962 the Air Training Corps celebrated its 21st anniversary. Celebrations were held around the country including a rugby game held at RNZAF Station Hobsonville in September and a team of cadets making an ultra-marathon relay run from Invercargill to Hobsonville, a distance of over 1,600km.

=== Modernization and restructuring ===
By 1970 Sea Cadet and ATC units had decreased to 55 units with 3,200 cadets. In 1971 the government decided to disband the ATC. This caused a public outcry, with support for the ATC coming from such organisations as the Returned Services Association, Brevet Clubs and the Air Force Association, forcing the Government to reconsider its decision. Instead, from 1972 the ATC was separated from the RNZAF and came under the umbrella of the newly formed NZCF, along with the Sea Cadets and New Zealand Cadet Corps, as a voluntary organisation under the Minister of Defence's responsibility. Units were required to be initiated and funded by the community. The Chief of Defence Forces was authorised to "direct and supervise" the Cadet Forces and provide military support, initially restricted to providing uniforms, training and equipment at a cost no greater than $400,000.

Although no longer an integral part of the services, the ATC is still administered by the Ministry of Defence. Under new legislation, the Air Cadet League was formed for the purpose of providing a supporting and funding role, although part of the annual Defence vote is still allocated to the Cadet Forces.

Centralised supervision was established under a Commandant. Regular Force Defence personnel, under the control of the Commandant, provided support units at five locations around New Zealand. ATC Officers ceased to have "Queen's Commissions" and are appointed by the Minister of Defence with Cadet Force commissions, effectively remaining civilian volunteers on an unpaid basis with authority to wear military uniform and rank.

Women were first accepted into the ATC in 1978 as a result of the Human Rights Commission Act 1977. The first recorded Woman to hold a commission in the New Zealand Air Training Corps was on the 28th of July 1978. In 1990, No. 38 (Waimairi) Squadron of the NZCF was the first to appoint a female Cadet Unit Commander.

During these changes, the focus of the NZCF changed from primarily military training and preparation for the Armed Forces to become predominantly based on adventure and youth development with a military flavour. The aim of this new thrust was to teach "good citizenship skills" to cadets.

By 1985 the ATC had increased to 50 units. A resurgence of interest since 1989, attributed to the movies such as Top Gun and Iron Eagle, saw unit numbers expand to around 100 units, many in areas that did not previously have cadet units.

=== ATC Golden Jubilee and the new Millennium ===
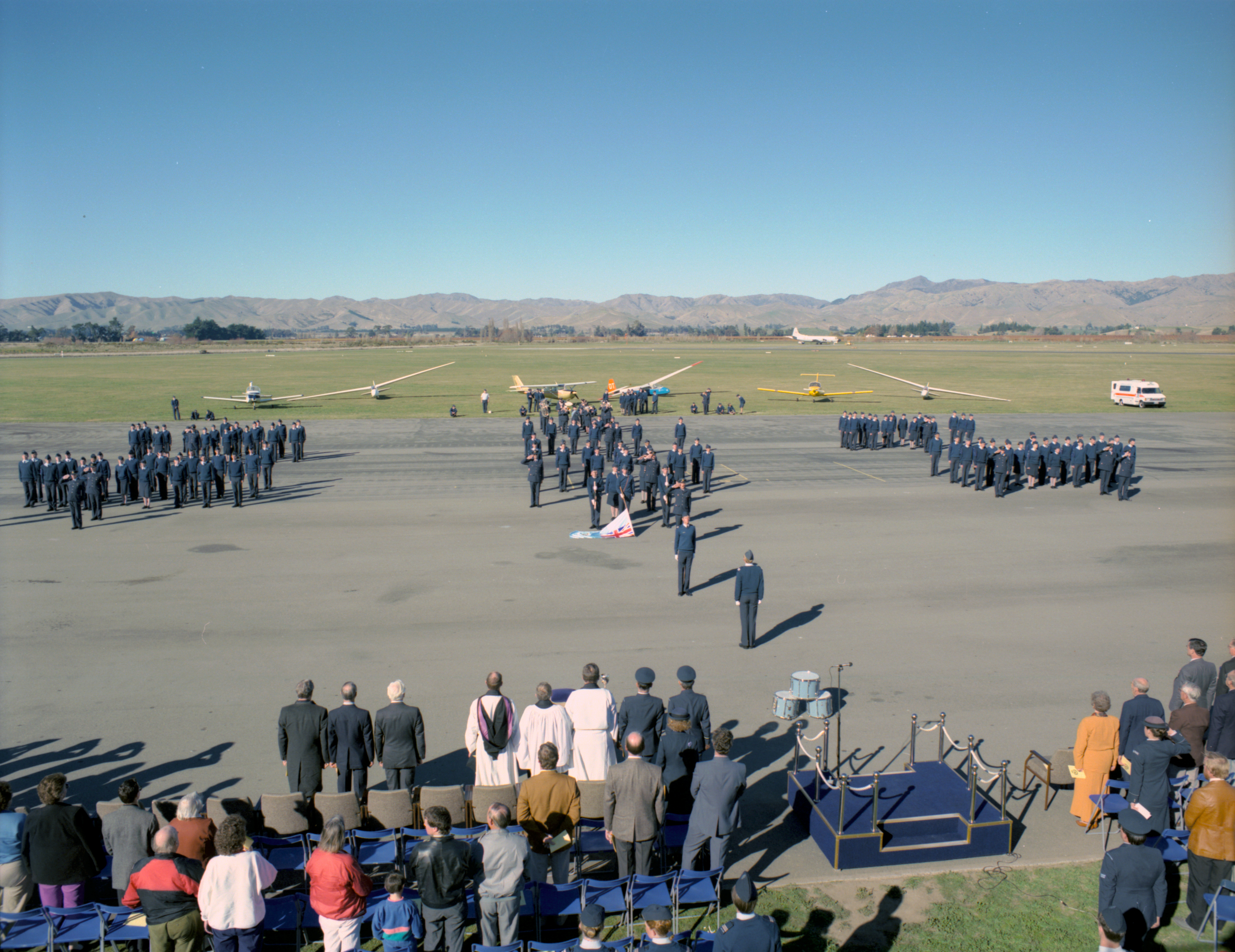
50th Anniversary parade at RNZAF Base Woodbourne.

In 1991 the ATC celebrated its Golden Jubilee. To celebrate and raise its public profile, cadets from every unit in New Zealand participated in a run that started at either end of the country and converged in Wellington. Along the way money was collected and donated to CANTEEN-teenagers with cancer.

In 2001 the ATC celebrated its Diamond Jubilee with special parades held in each area. By this time the ATC comprised 52 Squadrons from Kaitaia to Invercargill and approximately 2500 cadets.

At the beginning of 2010, there were 103 Cadet Force units In New Zealand, and cadet numbers were approximately 4500 with 360 cadet officers.

=== Air Training Corps' 75th Anniversary ===
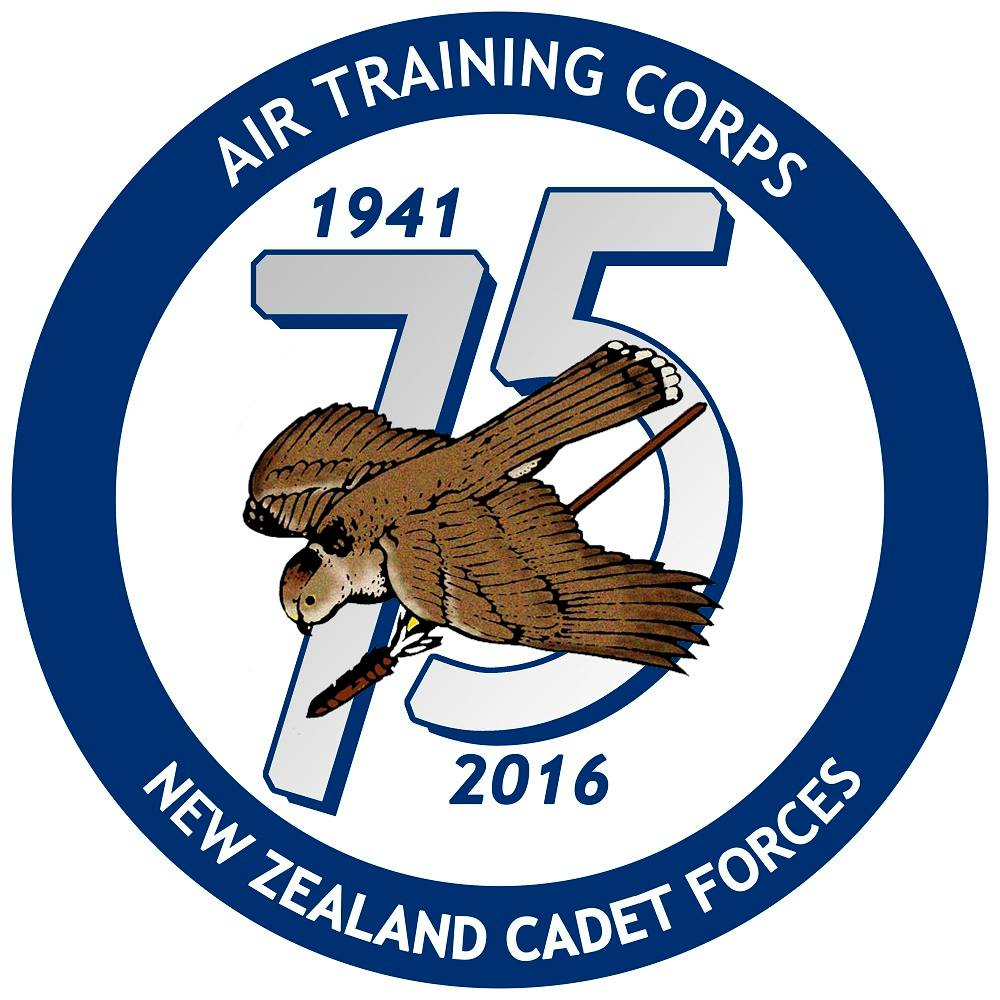
75th Anniversary Crest

The ATC celebrated its 75th anniversary in 2016 with numerous exercises and parades held around the country.

Southern area held exercise Southern Falcon at the West Melton Aerodrome, just west of Christchurch. More than 100 cadet force personnel attended, from nine units across the country. Cadets had the opportunity to fly in an RNZAF C-130H as well as visits to aviation facilities around Christchurch. The event ended with a formal dinner at the Air Force Museum.

Central area held exercise Silver Sparrowhawk at RNZAF Base Ohakea. The exercise had an attendance of over 150 personnel from nine units all over the lower North Island and functioned as both a celebration and as a friendly competition between central area ATC Squadrons. Activities included flights on RNZAF NH-90 helicopters, a Pōwhiri welcoming the ATC on to the RNZAF Tūrangawaewae. Cadets also participated in a "Village Green", which included a tug of war, fitness tests, observation exercises, and rogaining. No. 10 (Palmerston North) Squadron was awarded the winning trophy for the event.

Northern area units celebrated the anniversary with a combined parade with all seven of the Auckland ATC Squadrons. This event combined with the 76th anniversary of the Battle of Britain saw more than 320 cadets parade for the Chief of the Air Force, Air Vice Marshall Tony Davies, at the Auckland War Memorial Museum.

=== Air Training Corps' 80th Anniversary ===
2021 saw the ATC celebrate the 80th year since its formation. The seven local squadrons in Auckland joined with units outside of Auckland and the Auckland Air Force Association to mark both the 80th anniversary of the ATC and the annual Battle of Britain commemoration service.

== Organisation ==
=== National ===
The ATC is managed at a national level by the Commandant (usually a Regular Force Lieutenant-Colonel/Wing Commander/Commander), and their Staff based out of Trentham Army Camp. It is supported by the Air Training Corps Association of New Zealand (ATCANZ).

=== Area ===
The country is divided into 3 areas, Northern (northern half of the North Island), Central (southern half of the North Island) and Southern (entire South Island). Each area has a NZCF Cadet Force Training and Support Unit (CFTSU), commanded by an Area Coordinator, with Advisors for Air Training Corps Squadrons.

=== Unit ===
Typical squadron organization of an Air Training Corps unit in New Zealand.

Each unit is managed by the Cadet Unit Commander, in partnership with the unit's branch of the ATCANZ. A typical unit has between one and four officers filling various roles. The Cadet Unit Commander appoints all personnel in the unit to their positions. Each unit has an Adjutant, Training Officer, and Stores Officer. These positions are usually filled by commissioned officers (individual officers can hold multiple positions if necessary). One or more of these personnel may have assistants, often junior officers or senior non-commissioned officers (NCOs).

Each unit has a cadet NCO holding the position of Squadron Warrant Officer (who doesn't necessarily hold the rank of Cadet Warrant Officer). If the unit is large enough, each flight of cadets may have a Flight Sergeant. The Warrant Officer is normally responsible for supervising the NCOs in their various tasks. The Warrant Officer can skip the normal chain of command to liaise directly with the Unit Commander.

How an individual unit is organised varies widely. A unit's organisation depends on its size, number of officers, number of Cadet NCOs, facilities, and the organisational preference of the Cadet Unit Commander. Cadet units are graded on their parading numbers, which dictates the number of officers each unit may have, and the number of Corporals, Sergeants, Flight Sergeants and Officer Cadets.

== Air Training Corps Association of New Zealand (ATCANZ) ==
The Air Training Corps Association of New Zealand was formed as a result of the Defence Act 1990. This is the secondary support body of the New Zealand Air Training Corps, behind only Headquarters New Zealand Cadet Forces.

The association has a branch in every ATC squadron, made up of up to eight members of that unit. These members are usually parents of cadets belonging to that squadron, however other persons involved in the unit are also able to serve as committee members. The method of selecting committee members is by election of self-nominated personnel during a general meeting. The Cadet Unit Commander or a delegate officer from the unit is also expected to be a sitting member of the committee to ensure that the branch is kept informed of squadron activities and that the branch aligns its practices with the Unit Commander's intent and direction.

Each branch has three elected positions: Chairperson, Secretary and Treasurer. People self-nominate for these positions then face election by the general committee.

=== Meetings ===
==== Local branch general meetings ====
Branches convene for annual general meetings shortly after the end of each financial year to elect new position holders and decide strategy for the next year. These meetings are often held at the relevant cadet unit's headquarters or the nearest Royal New Zealand Returned and Services' Association (RSA). Special meetings normally occur on a monthly basis or whenever needed depending on the operational tempo of the squadron.

==== National council annual general meetings ====
Each year the ATCANZ National Council holds an Annual General Meeting. A representative from every ATCANZ branch is invited to attend so the location is chosen to be most convenient for travel. In recent years this has been at RNZAF Base Ohakea.

The purpose of this meeting is to facilitate the meeting of every unit's ATCANZ branch and allow them to coordinate on a national level. Often the Minister of Defence will be in attendance, as well as the Commandant NZCF, Assistant Commandant NZCF, and Returned Serviceman Association leadership.

=== Scholarships and awards ===
Each year ATCANZ provides a number of scholarships to Air Training Corps Personnel, including,

- The Sainsbury Awards
- Partial funding for cadets participating in the International Air Cadet Exchange
- Partial funding for cadets participating in the National Aviation course
- Partial funding for cadets participating in the National Gliding course

Further prizes are given to cadets on Air Training Corps aviation courses;

Air Training Corps Association of New Zealand Aviation Course Prizes
Prize	Criteria	Award
Air New Zealand Prize, for the top power flying student	This prize is awarded to the cadet who has performed at the highest level to come top in the Powered Flying Flight, with a positive attitude and aptitude in their overall airmanship and flying.	Prize is a day with a domestic crew on an Air New Zealand A320
RNZAF Prize for the top Air Navigation Student	This prize is awarded to the cadet who has performed at the highest level in Air Navigation, is eager to learn and grasp new concepts, and to look for challenges during the course.	Prize is $300 cash and a day with an RNZAF Orion crew
Charles Todd Trust	This prize is awarded for achievement.	Two prizes of $1,000 paid to the flying training organisation of the cadet's choice.
RNZAFA – Stan Quill	This prize is awarded to the Power Flying student who gained most from the course and who is likely to benefit most from additional flying experience	Prize of $1,000 paid to the flying training organisation of the cadet's choice.
Air New Zealand Regional Prizes	These prizes are awarded to the students who would represent ATC in a positive light and would benefit from the experience.	Four prizes of a jump seat flight on one of the Air New Zealand Regional operations.
Phil Le Couteur Safety Prize	This prize is awarded to the student who best exemplifies a commitment to safety in the air and on the ground.	Prize is $250 cash.
New Zealand Association of Women in Aviation	This prize is presented to the female aviation student who has best demonstrated team work, a willingness to participate, general conduct, and flying skills.	Prize as donated annually by NZAWA
Marlborough RSA Award	This is awarded to a Navigation student who has improved the most in all areas of the Navigation course.	Prize as donated annually by Marlborough RSA
Aviation News	These prizes are awarded to the students in both flights who display a keen interest in aviation and who have worked hard on the course.	Power Flight – 3 subscriptions to AVIATION NEWS Navigation Flight – 3 subscriptions to AVIATION NEWS

== Uniform and Insignia ==
=== Insignia and Badges ===
The uniform worn by ATC members is the same as that of the Royal New Zealand Air Force, except that for all ranks, the lettering on the bottom of the rank insignia shoulder boards reads "CADET FORCES" rather than "NEW ZEALAND" to differentiate ATC personnel from RNZAF personnel. Officer Service Dress Uniforms have a shoulder flash reading "NEW ZEALAND CADET FORCES" rather than "ROYAL NEW ZEALAND AIR FORCE" for the same reason. Cadets wear a cloth "ATC" cap badge on their flight caps, while officers and officer cadets wear the same cap insignia as RNZAF officers. Since 2019, all ATC personnel wear dark blue oval badges with "AIR TRAINING CORPS" on their shoulders to differentiate them from the RNZAF. Cadets wear a shoulder brassard on their right arm to display their individual achievements, which further distinguishes them from RNZAF personnel. Cadet achievements include The Duke of Edinburgh's Award, flying/navigation badge, marksman badge and training level badges, and the number and name of the squadron they parade with. Commissioned Officers, Officer Cadets, National, and Area Warrant Officers do not wear brassards.

=== Uniforms ===
The Air Training Corps follows the Royal New Zealand Air Force (RNZAF) with regard to uniform standards and clothing items. All mandatory clothing is issued by the RNZAF.

Before December 2020, each unit was graded on the number of personnel who attended parade nights, and based on this grade, received an annual allowance for cadets' uniforms. Since December 2020, new uniform is issued directly new cadets upon their enrolment into a squadron after their measurements are entered into CadetNet. Units still maintain a local supply of uniform as spares, but the bulk of uniform issued to new recruits comes from Headquarters New Zealand Cadet Forces.

The Air Training Corps currently uses the following uniforms:

Uniform	No. 3 Service Dress	No. 4 Working Dress	PT Kit
Notes	Used for primarily special occasions such as ANZAC Day.	Commonly known as CWDs or Cadet Working Dress, the most commonly worn uniform.	No fixed standard, Usually worn with squadron T-shirt, corps cap and running shoes but is at discretion of Cadet Unit Commanders.

=== Air Cadet Working Dress ===
New Zealand disruptive pattern material was adopted as an official ATC uniform in 2002. In 2018 the NZDF moved away from the disruptive pattern material so the ATC explored new uniforms. The product of that exploration is the 'Cadet Working Dress' (CWD).

Intended to be introduced in late 2021, the New Zealand Sea Cadet Corps and ATC have a new single multipurpose uniform. The ATC was to adopt the uniform first to free up remaining disruptive pattern material for the New Zealand Cadet Corps. The style of the new uniform was modeled on the RNZAF's General Purpose Uniform but was not made of fire-retardant fabric as cadets' risk of fire was lower. These modifications and bulk ordering made the uniform affordable to the organisation. The Sea Cadet retained the darker blue colour of the Royal New Zealand Navy's General Working Dress, but was otherwise identical.

Cadets and Officer are issued a 'pack' of equipment and uniform from New Zealand Cadet Forces Headquarters that includes their general purpose uniform (No. 6 GP).

As well as the key components of shirt, pants and boots, the New Zealand Cadet Forces also intend to roll out accessories such as rain jackets, either to be supplied or purchased through the NZCF. More accessories are yet to be announced but warm weather equipment such as jerseys, wind breakers, and high visibility vests have been speculated by NZCF personnel.

The supplier for the Cadet Working Dress was based in Fiji, and introduction of the uniform was delayed by the COVID-19 pandemic in Fiji. Roll out of the uniform commenced in July 2021, with more than 300 personnel receiving their uniform by 18 July. By 11 August every Squadron in the South Island had been equipped with Cadet Working Dress with squadrons in the North Island to follow shortly after.

=== Unit Recognition Patches ===
Subject to approval by the Commandant NZCF, Units are authorised to design and produce Unit Recognition Patches (URP) for their personnel to wear. For the ATC, authorised Unit Recognition Patches are square 80 mm x 80 mm patches fastened by Velcro to Cadet Working Dress.

Unit Recognition Patches are commonly gifted to other units as signs of goodwill and friendship but they may only be worn by members belonging to that particular unit. The New Zealand Cadet Forces operate the NZCF logo as a recognition patch, although these are only worn by personnel attached to Headquarters NZCF, or Cadet Force Training and Support Units (CFTSUs).

== Ranks ==
All active Air Cadets are able to work towards being promoted. The size of each unit dictates the number of cadets at each rank that a unit is allowed.

=== Cadet and Non-Commissioned Officer Ranks ===
Cadet and Non-Commissioned Officer ranks are based on the RNZAF ranks, and are:

Rank	Abbreviation	Basic Requirements to be awarded	Designation
Cadet Under Training	CDTUT	Awarded upon successfully joining an Air Training Corps Squadron.	N/A
Cadet	CDT	Awarded upon completing the Basic Barracks (Basic Training) course.	CDT 1
Leading Air Cadet	LACDT	Completed Basic Two training as per the NZCF 170C.; The cadet must have attended a minimum of 20 parades and be suitable to act as flight marker.	CDT 2
Corporal	CDTCPL	Successfully completed the NZCF Junior Non-Commissioned Officer Course.; Completed Proficiency training as per the NZCF 170C.; No disciplinary or performance issues.	CDT 3
Sergeant	CDTSGT	Successfully completed the NZCF Senior Non-Commissioned Officer Course.; Completed Advanced training as per the NZCF 170C.; No disciplinary or performance issues.	CDT 4
Flight Sergeant	CDTF/S	Completed a minimum of six months serving in the rank of Sergeant.; No disciplinary or performance issues.	CDT 5
Warrant Officer	CDTW/O	Completed a minimum of six months serving in the rank of Flight Sergeant.; No disciplinary or performance issues; Note: units occasionally promote personnel to Warrant Officer from the rank of Sergeant.	CDT 7

The CDT prefix/suffix is used to distinguish cadet ranks from those of regular force personnel. The only other difference is that in the RNZAF, LAC stands for Leading Aircraftman

Not all cadets progress to non-commissioned officer roles, but all have the opportunity to advance through the training levels of Basic 1, Basic 2, Proficiency, and Advanced by demonstrating competence in subjects including cadet force knowledge, general service knowledge, leadership, firearms safety, and aviation.

In early 2007, the Chief of Air Staff accepted the introduction of the rank of Leading Air Cadet (LACDT). This is not regarded as an NCO rank but will be awarded to those cadets showing obvious leadership skills or to give seniority to long-serving or older cadets who may not otherwise have been given a chance to go on a junior NCO course. This is the ATC equivalent to the NZCC Lance Corporal and Sea Cadet Corps' Able Cadet.

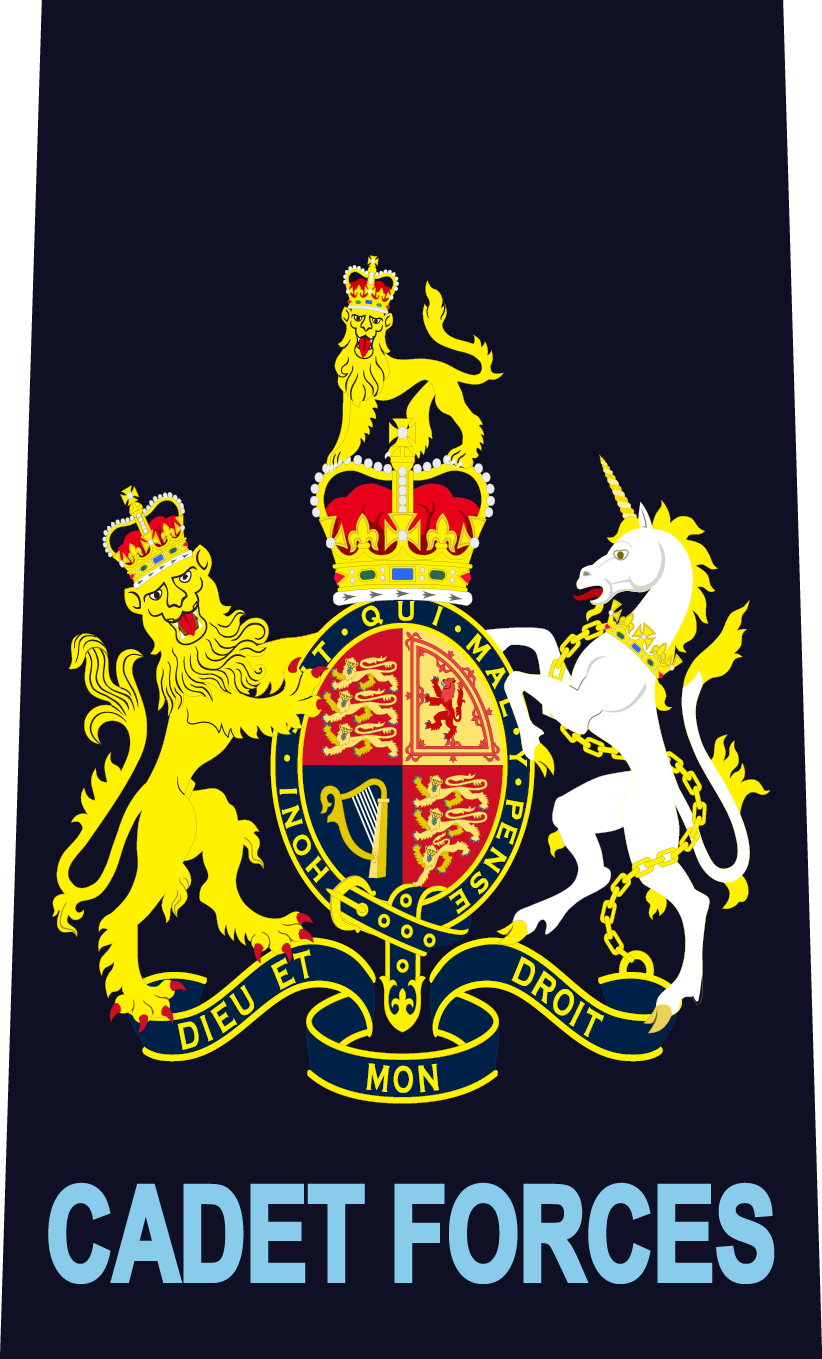
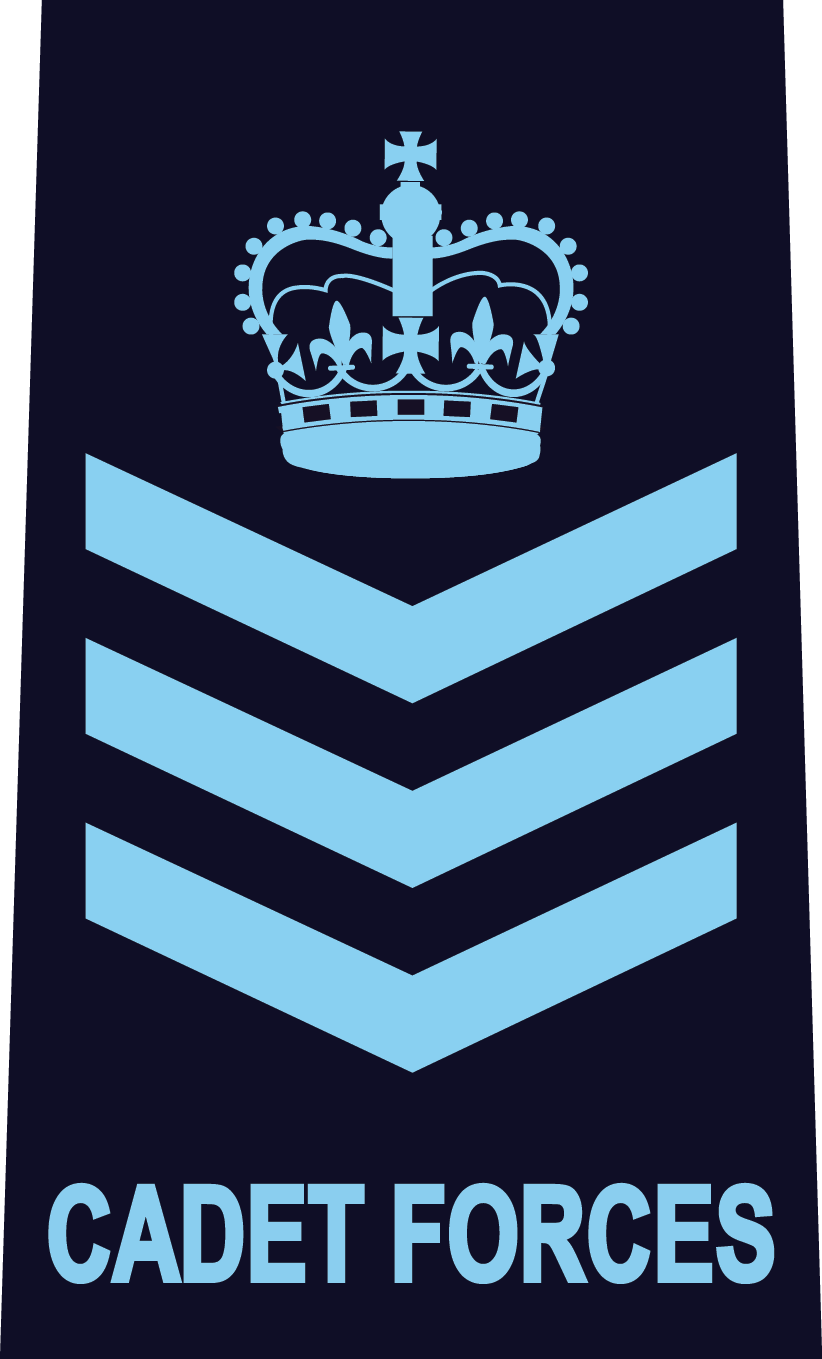
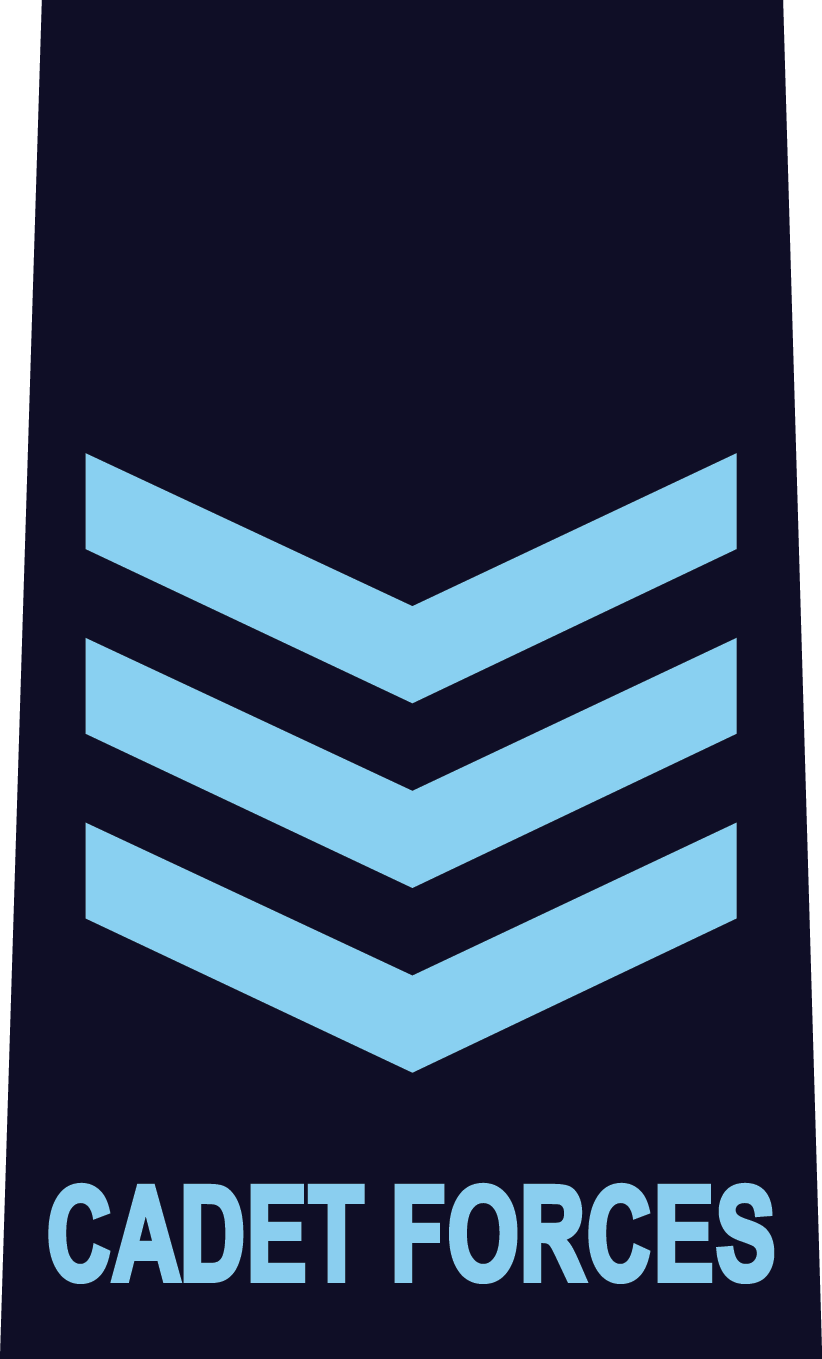
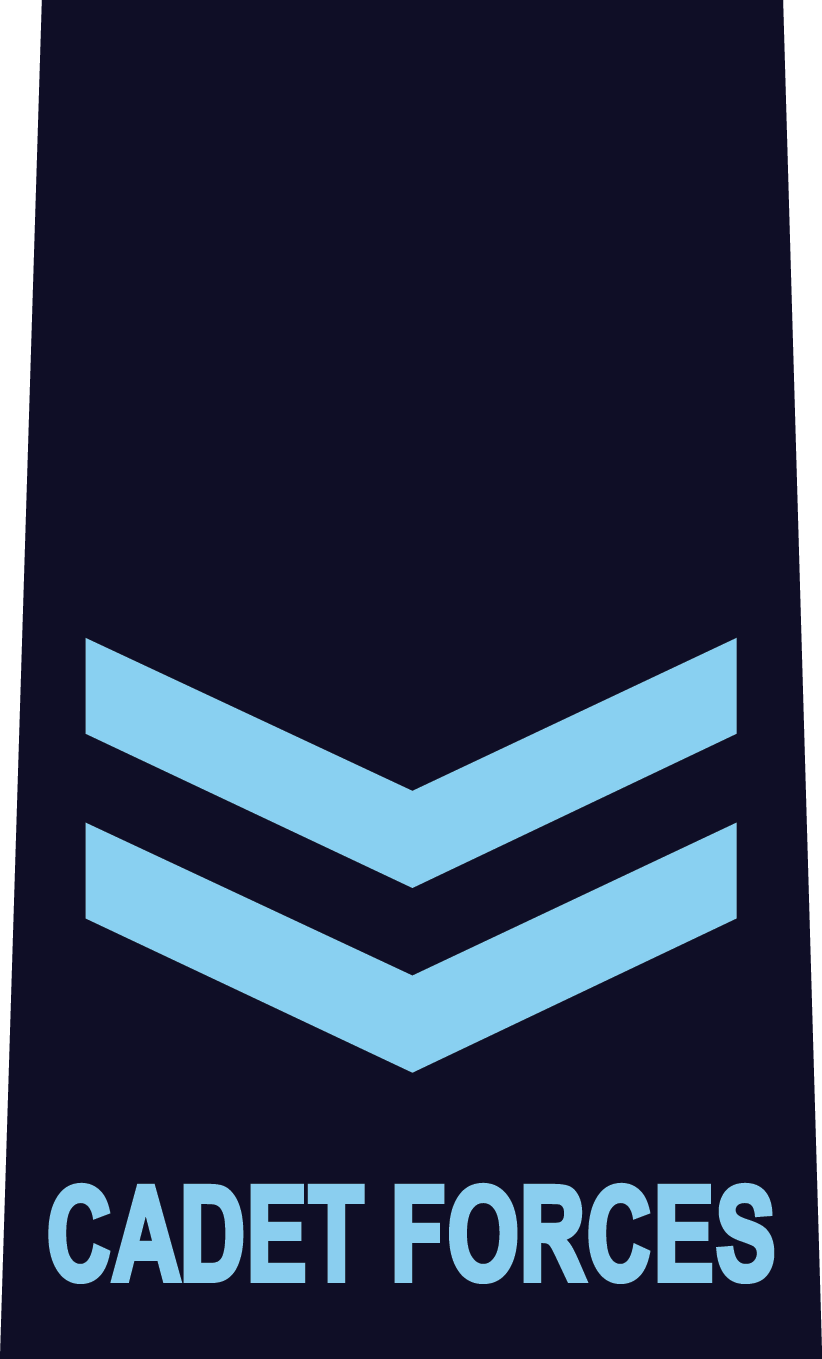
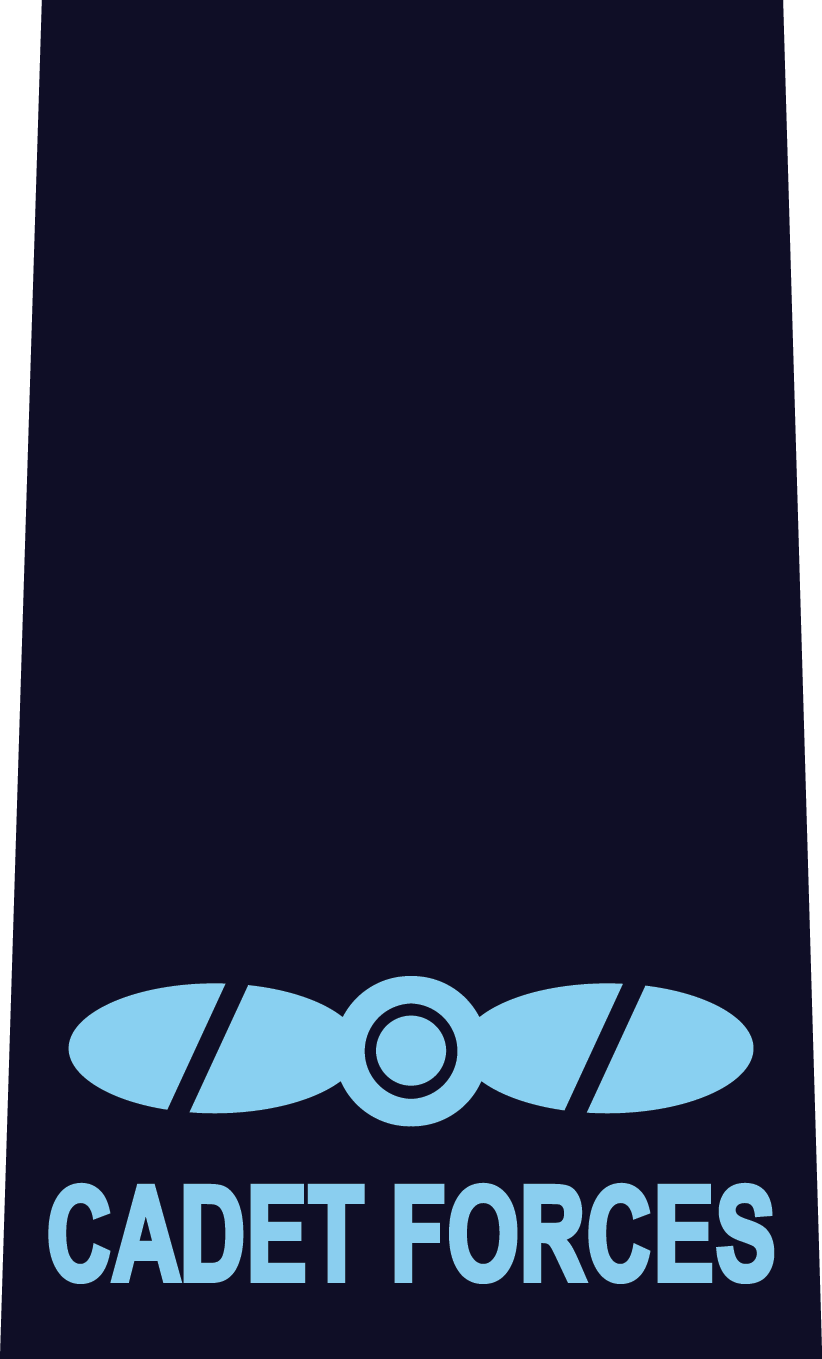
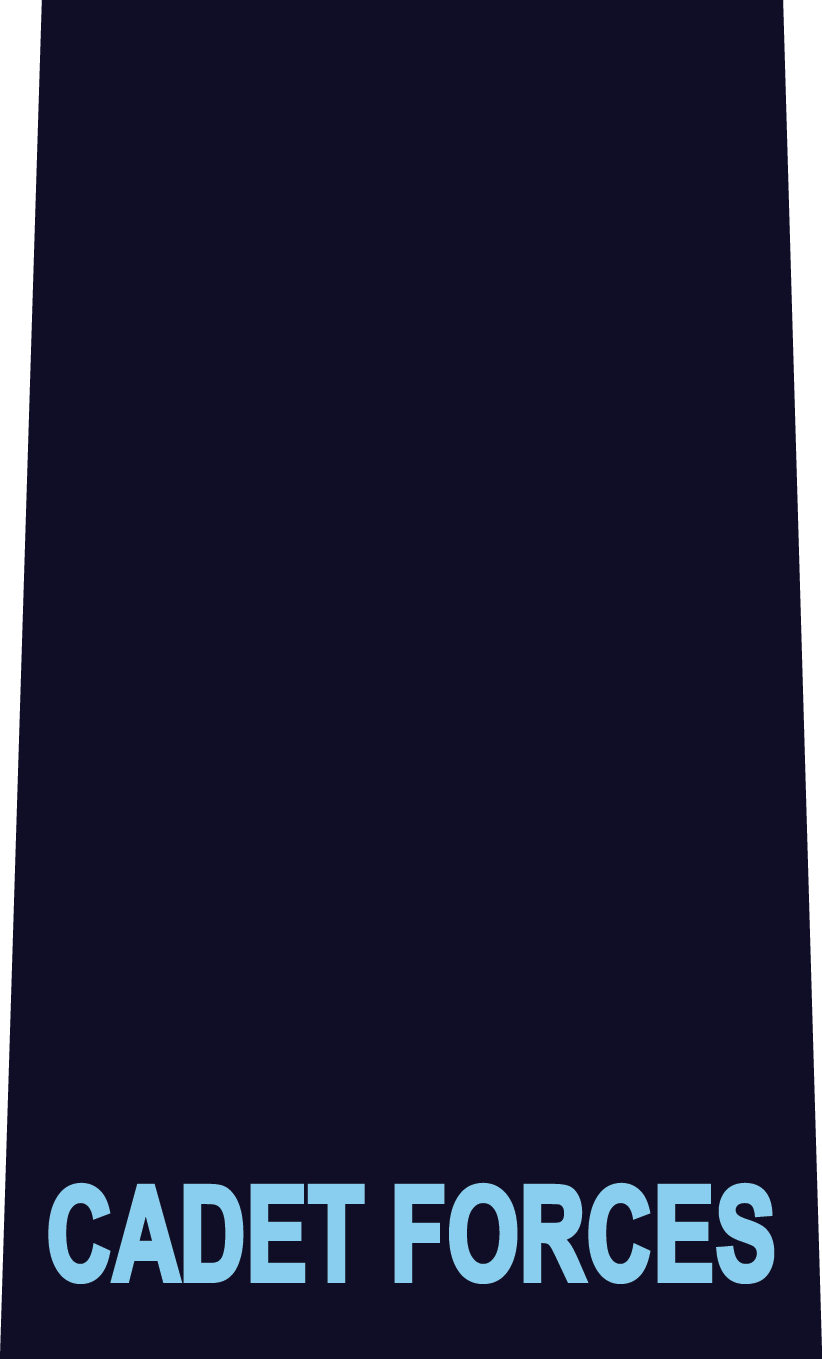
NZCF Cadets	CDT 7	CDT 6	CDT 5	CDT 4	CDT 3	CDT 2	CDT 1
New Zealand Air Training Corps
New Zealand Air Training Corps	Cadet Warrant Officer		Cadet Flight Sergeant	Cadet Sergeant	Cadet Corporal	Leading Air Cadet	Cadet
New Zealand Air Training Corps	CDTW/O		CDTF/S	CDTSGT	CDTCPL	LAC	CDT

=== Commissioned Officer Ranks ===
Air Training Corps Officers also follow RNZAF Ranks:

Rank	Abbreviation	General Requirements to be awarded	Designation
Officer Cadet	OFFCDT	Two entry paths; Serving cadet, upon turning 19 decides to commission in which case the rank will be awarded before the individual's next birthday.; Direct entry as a civilian adult member deciding they wish to commission, in which case they need to serve 6 months at the unit to establish whether the professional relationship is sustainable for both the unit and the individual, after 6 months and upon completion of the relevant online learning modules HQNZCF may award the rank.	O1
Acting Pilot Officer	A/PLTOFF	Awarded upon successful completion of the NZCF Officer Commissioning Course. Personnel will serve one year in an acting capacity. After one year efficient service they are substantiated as Pilot Officers and awarded their Commission Parchment (on the authority of the Minister of Defence)	Nil
Pilot Officer	PLTOFF	Have completed twelve months efficient service in the Acting Pilot Officer rank.; Be assessed by the Cadet Unit Commander as suitable and recommended for appointment to a confirmed commissioned.; Recommended by Cadet Unit Commander and the Area Coordinator of the relevant Cadet Force Training and Support Unit.; Approved by the Commandant NZCF.	O2
Flying Officer	FGOFF	Have completed two years efficient service in the substantive rank of Pilot Officer.; Successfully completed the Instructional and Training Management course; Recommended by Cadet Unit Commander and the Area Coordinator of the relevant Cadet Force Training and Support Unit.; Approved by the Commandant NZCF.	O3
Flight Lieutenant (Pronounced: Flight Leftenant)	FLTLT	Have completed four years' efficient service in the substantive rank of Flying Officer.; Recommended by Cadet Unit Commander and the Area Coordinator of the relevant Cadet Force Training and Support Unit.; Approved by the Commandant NZCF.	O4
Squadron Leader	SQNLDR	Have completed five years' efficient service in the substantive rank of Flight Lieutenant; Successfully completed the NZCF Command Course and intend to serve either as a Cadet Unit Commander or Area Support Officer.; Recommended by Cadet Unit Commander and the Area Coordinator of the relevant Cadet Force Training and Support Unit.; Approved by the Commandant NZCF.	O5
Wing Commander	WGCDR	Only the person in the position of Assistant Commandant holds this rank.	O6

Officer Ranks and Insignia in the ATC

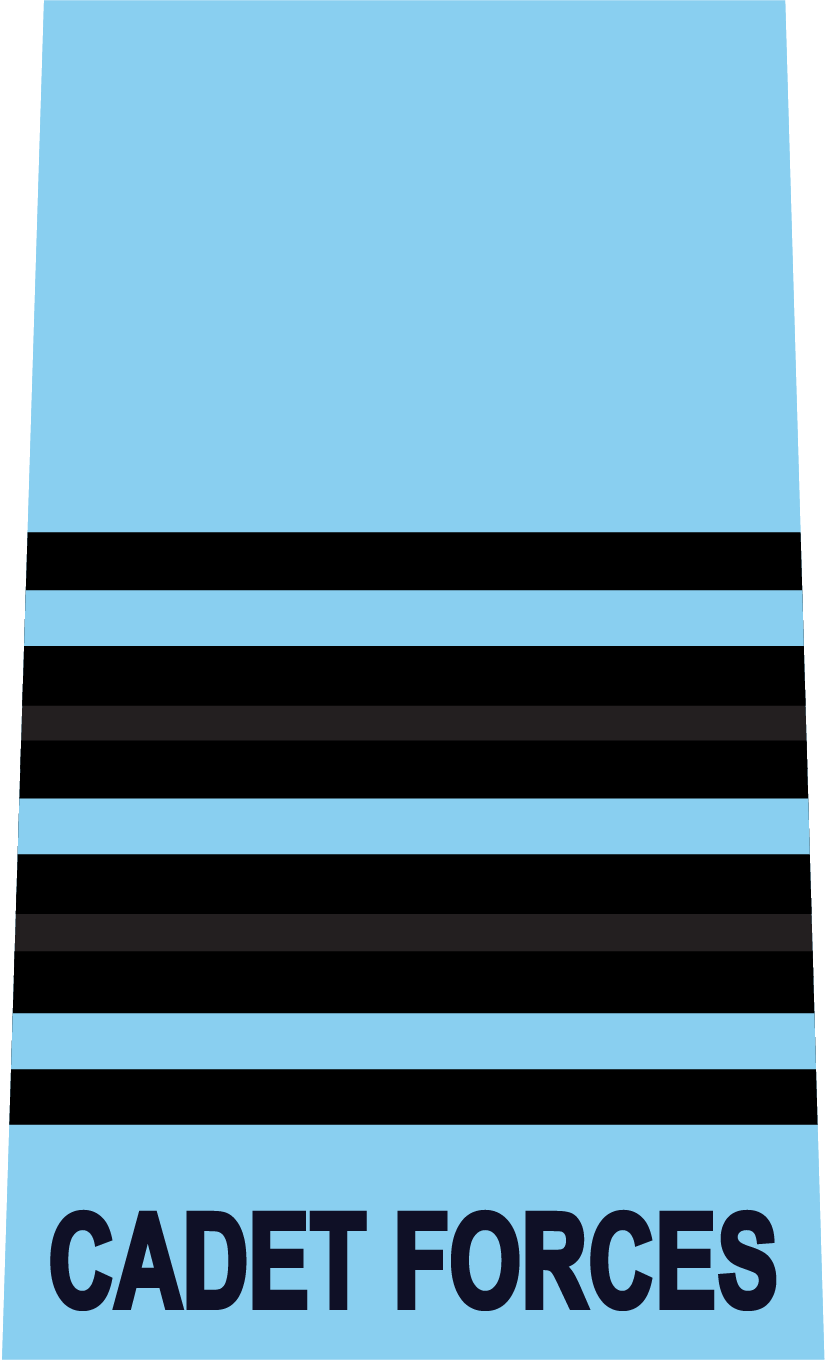
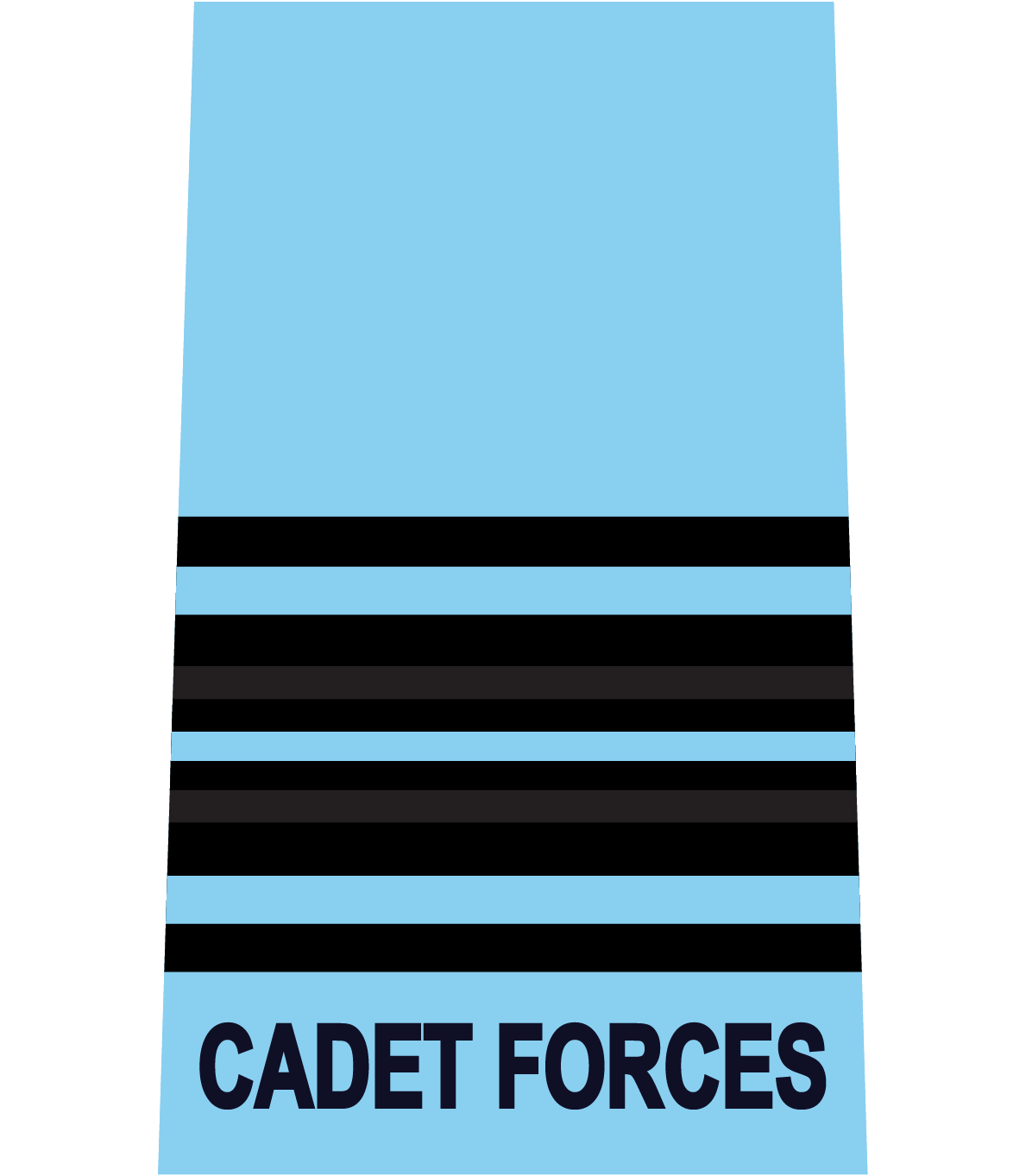
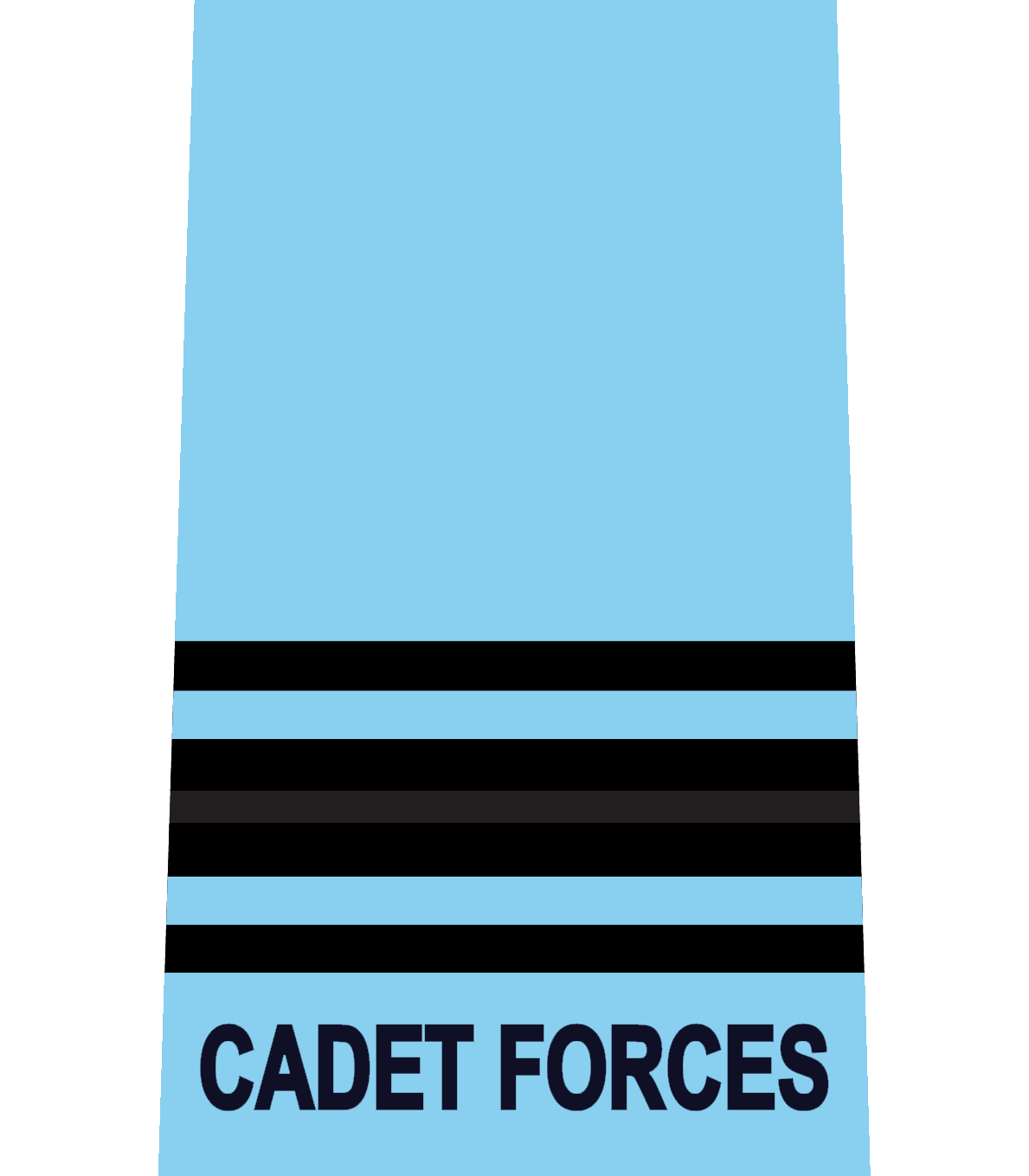
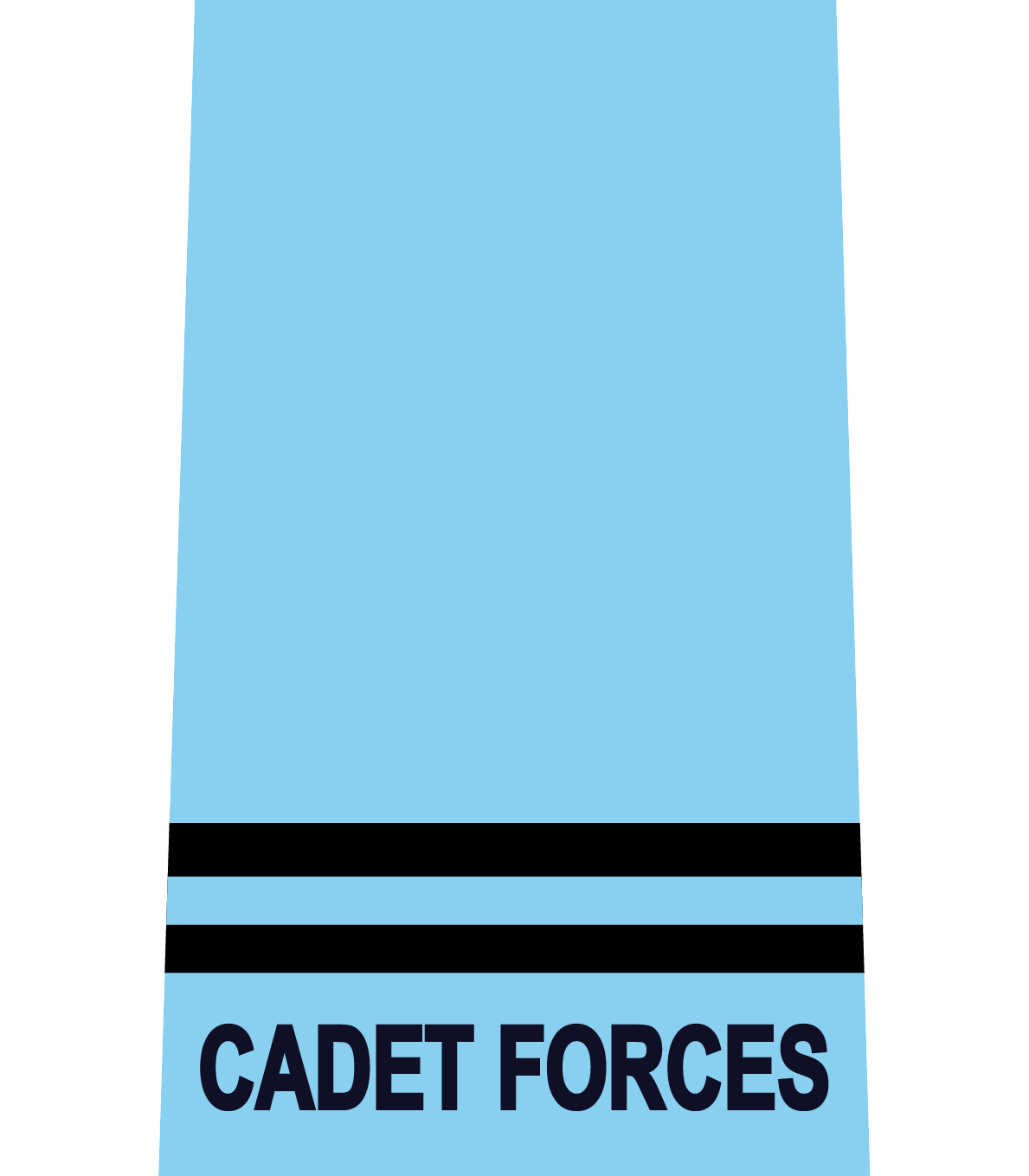
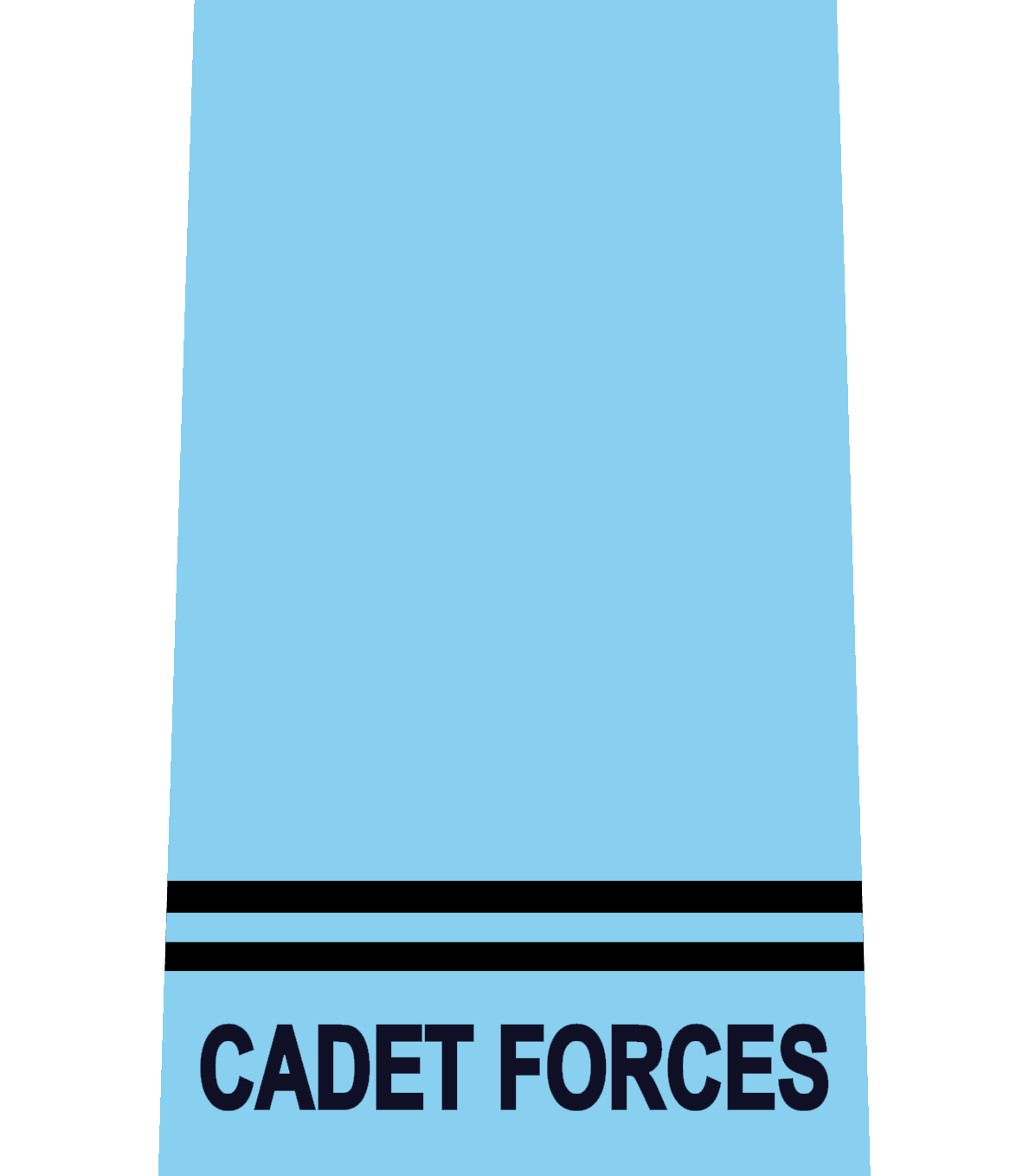
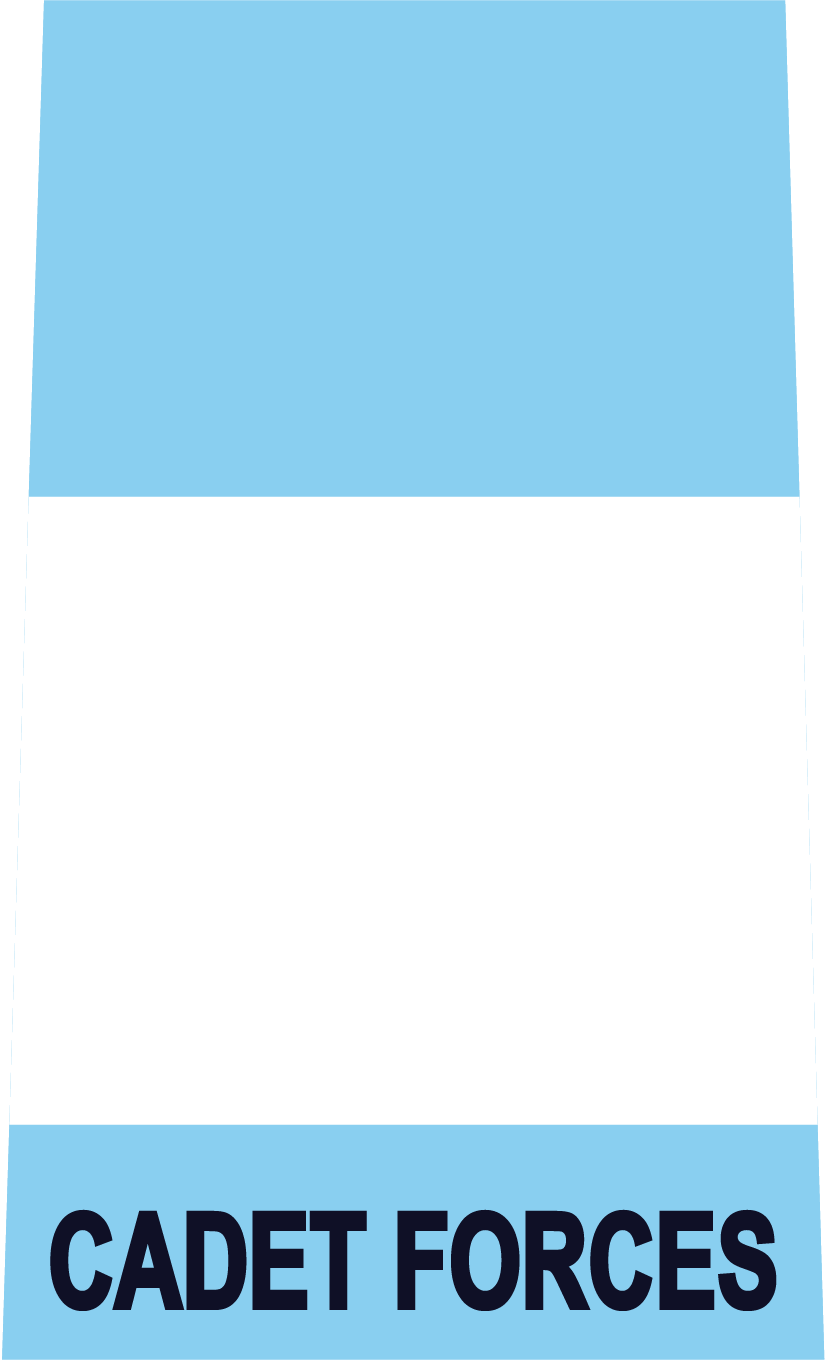
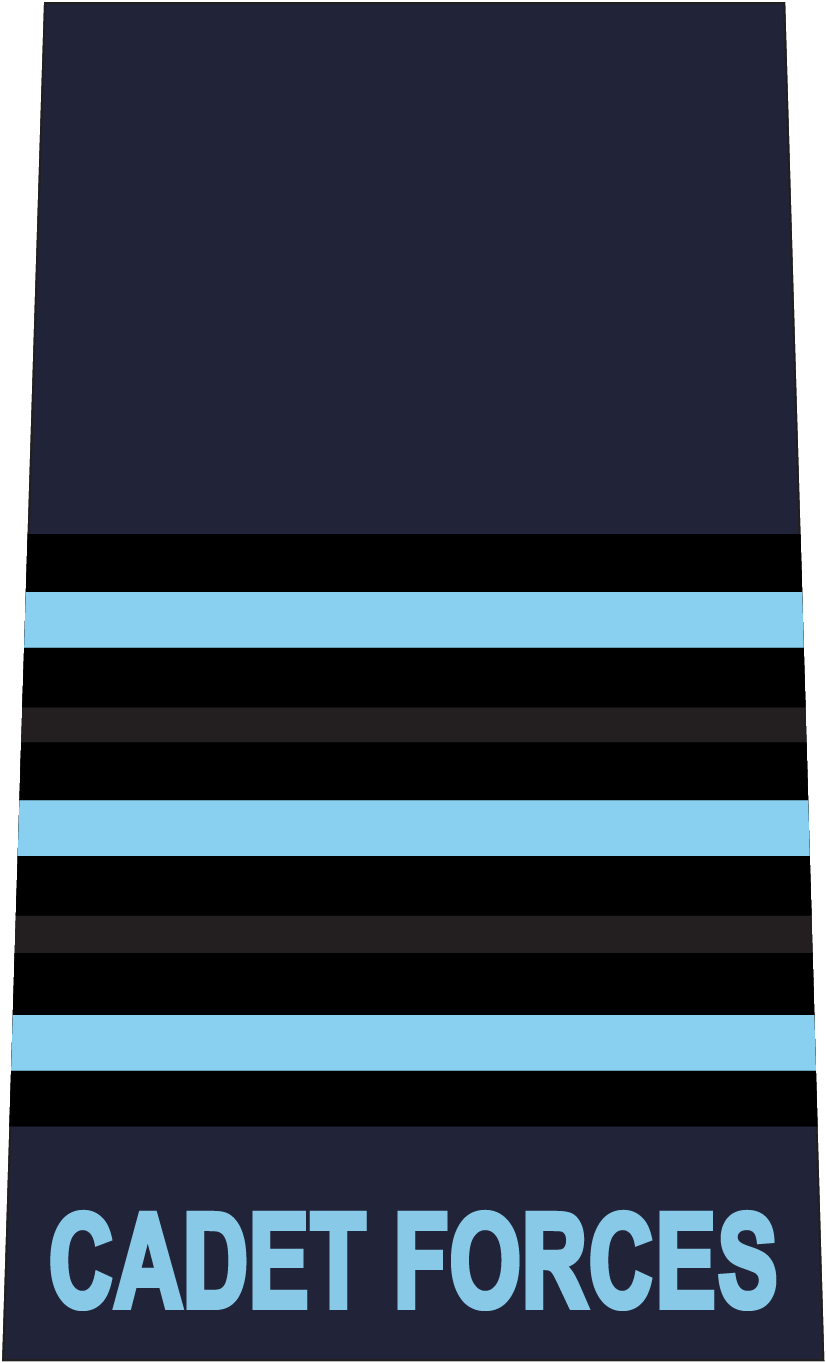
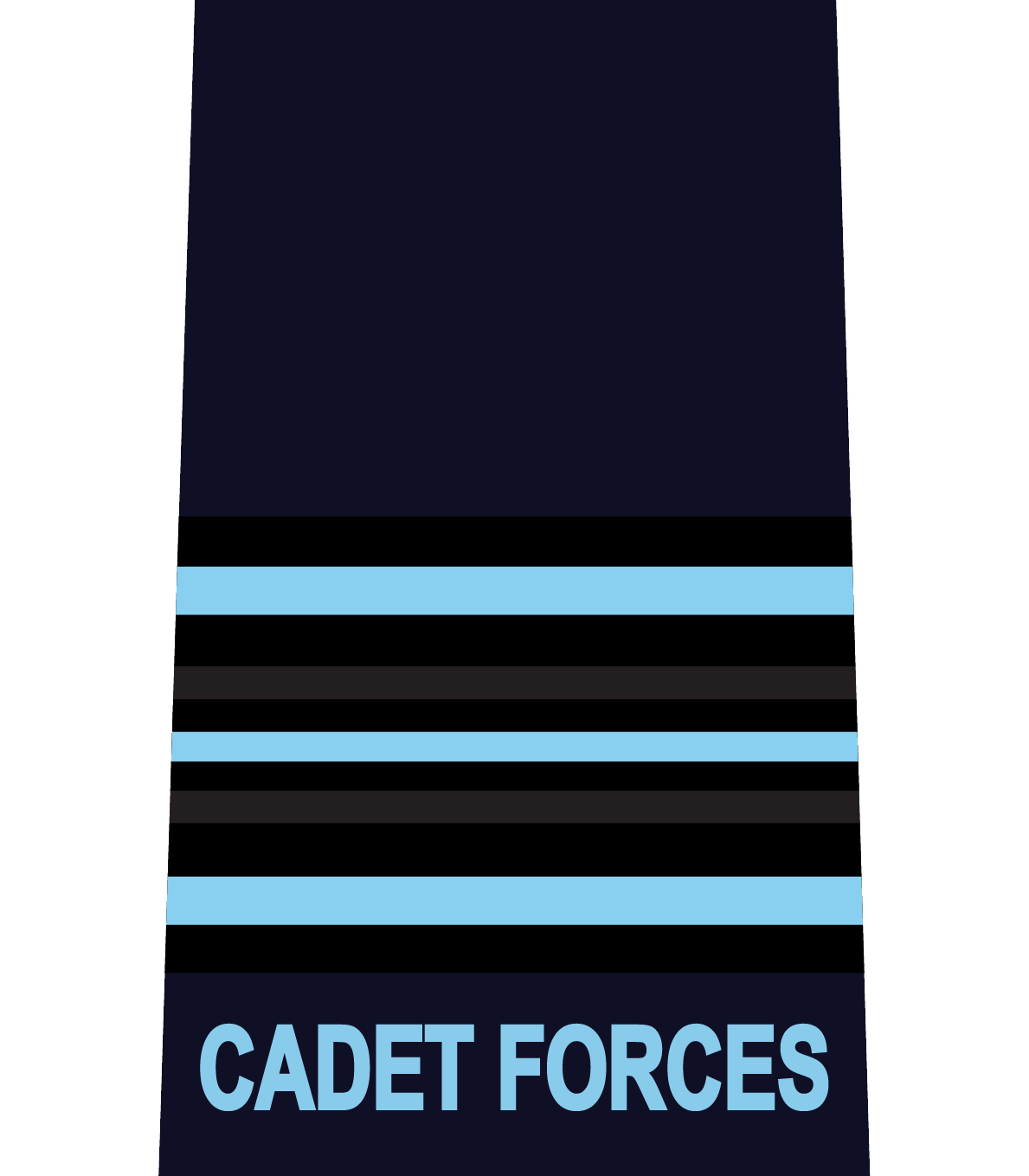
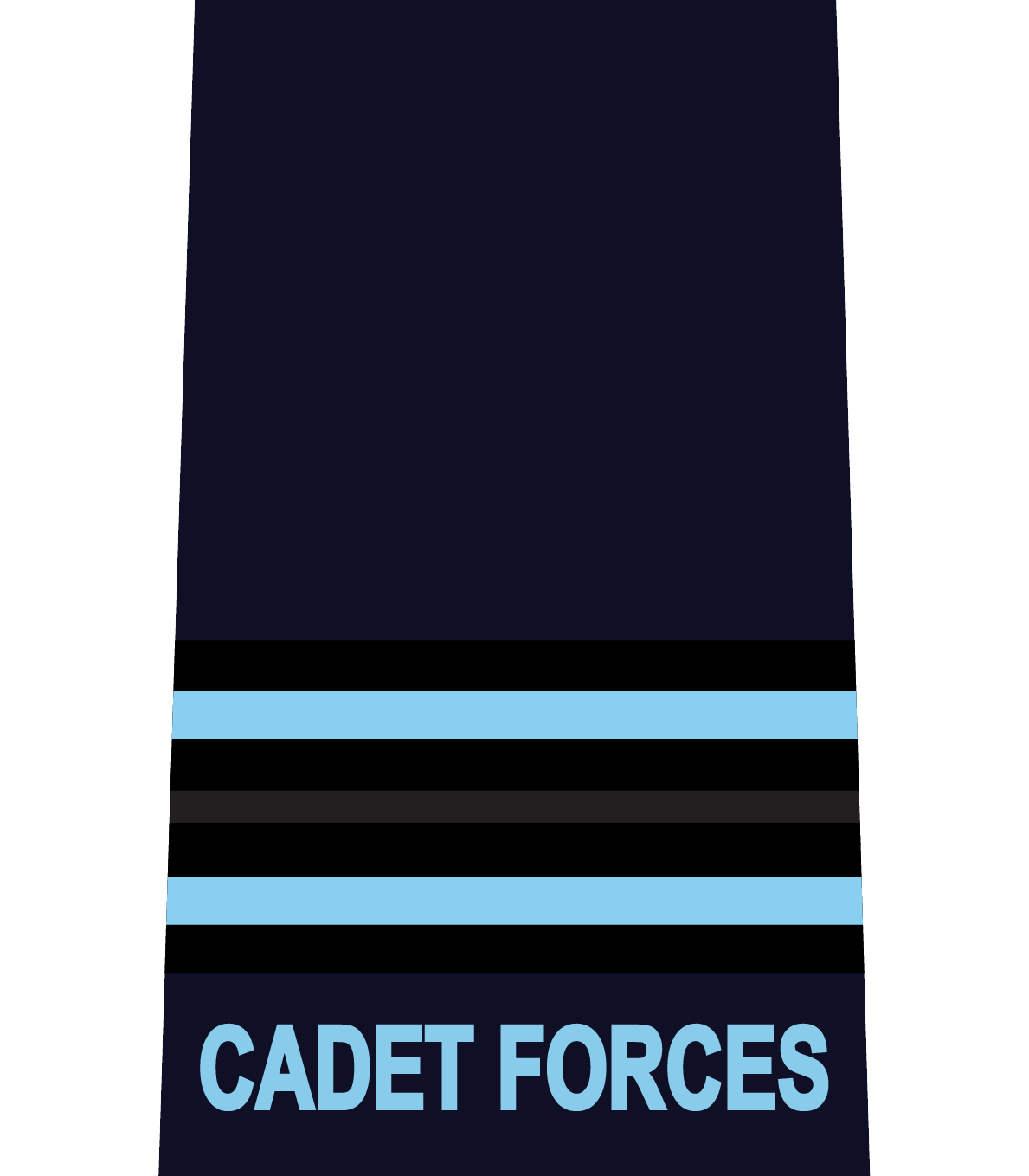
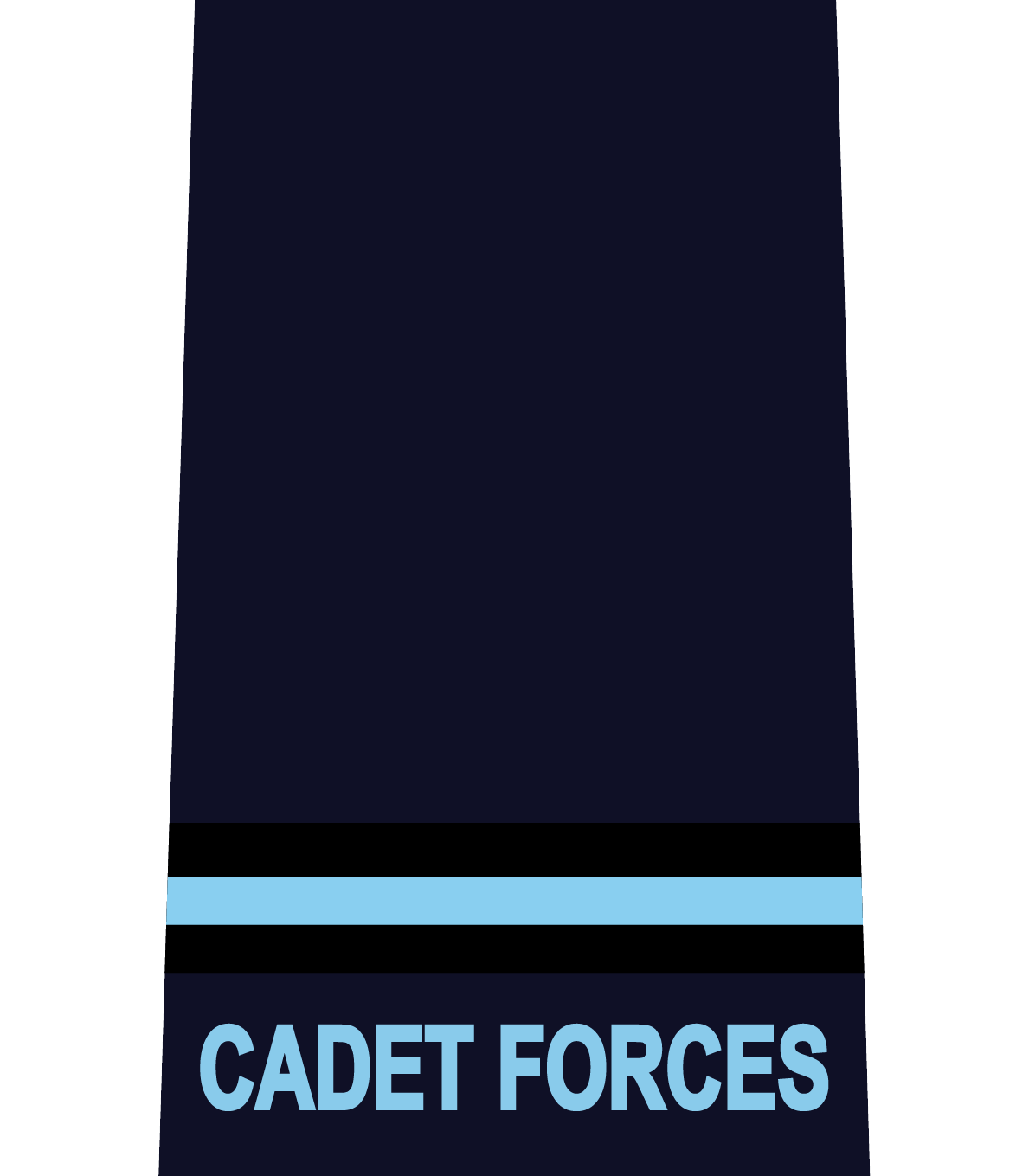
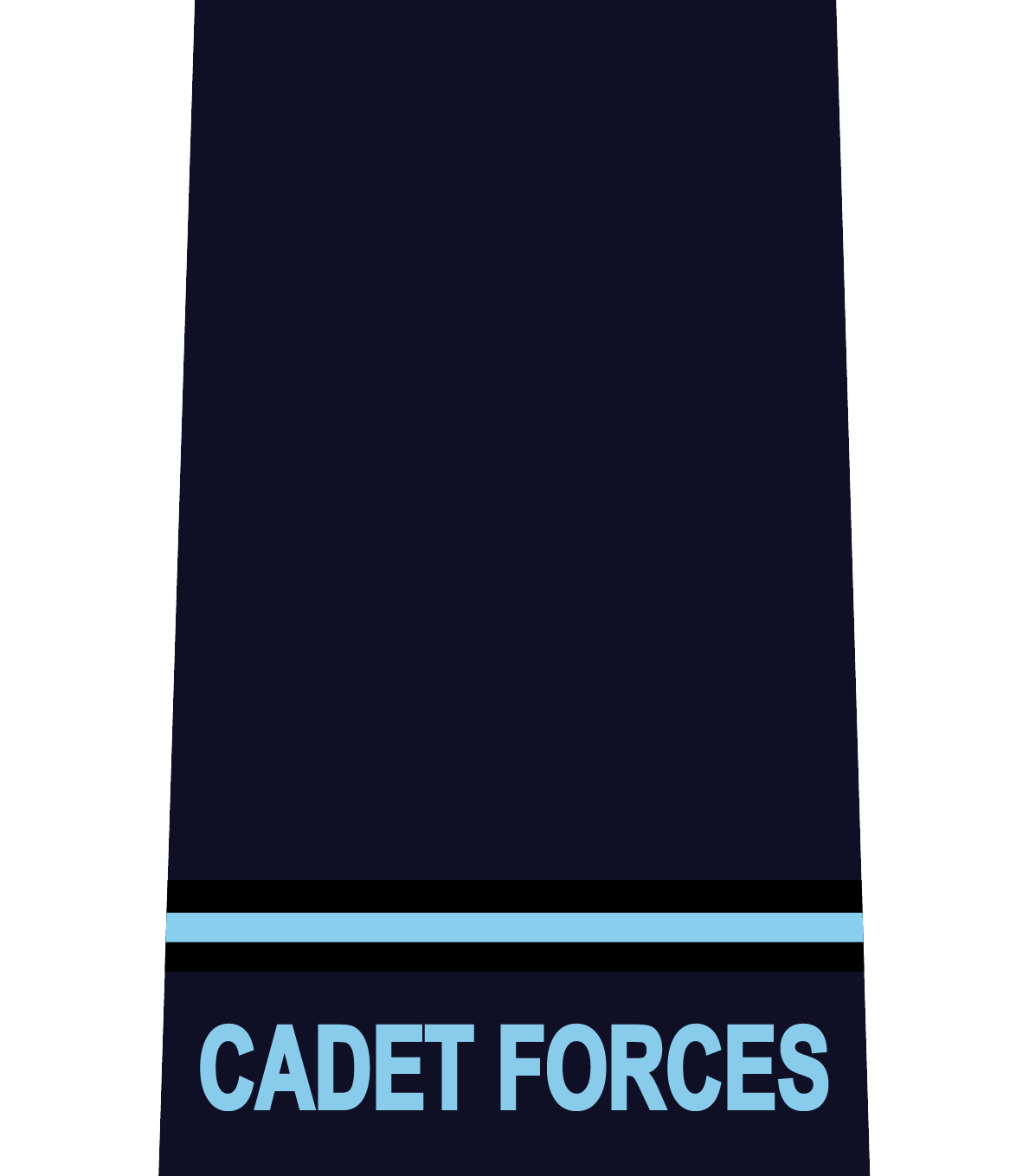
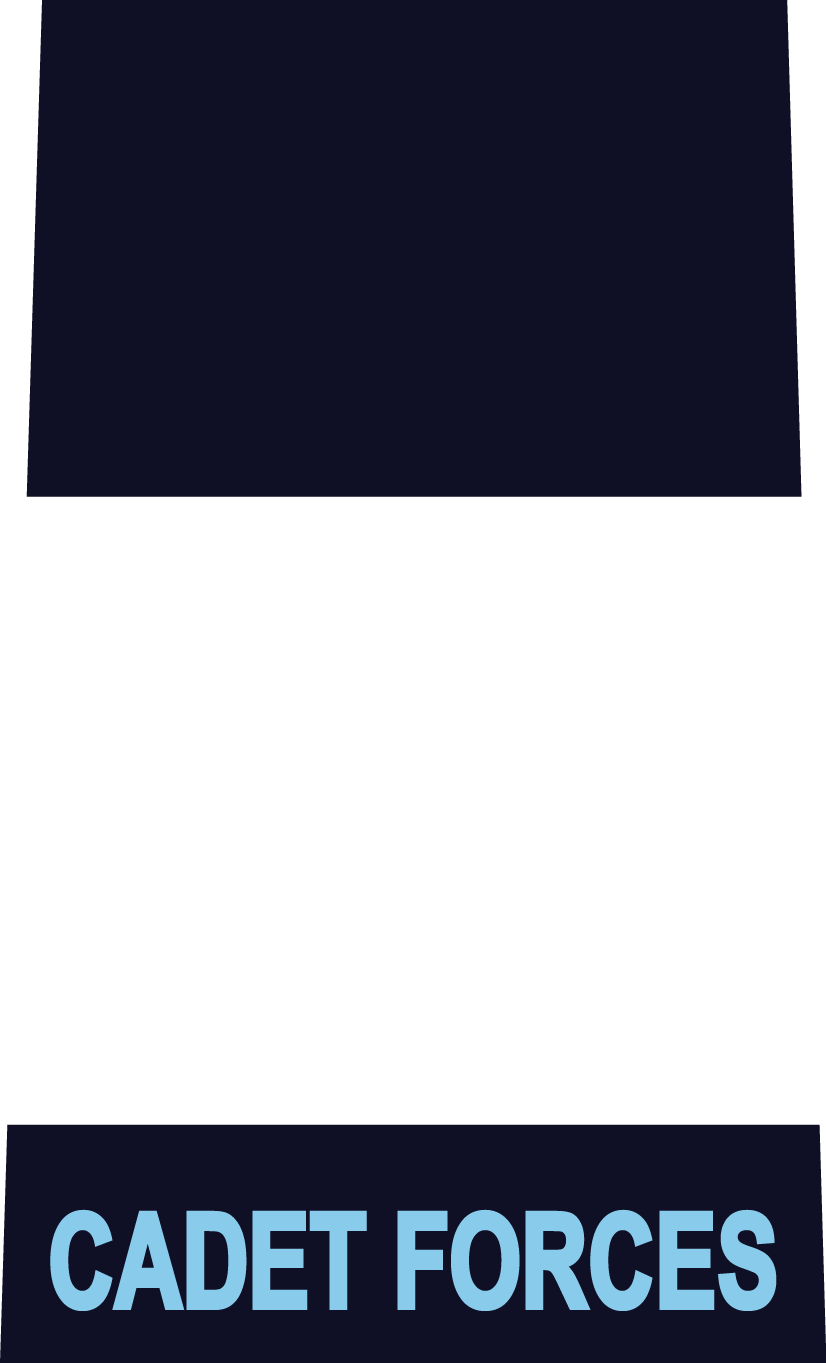
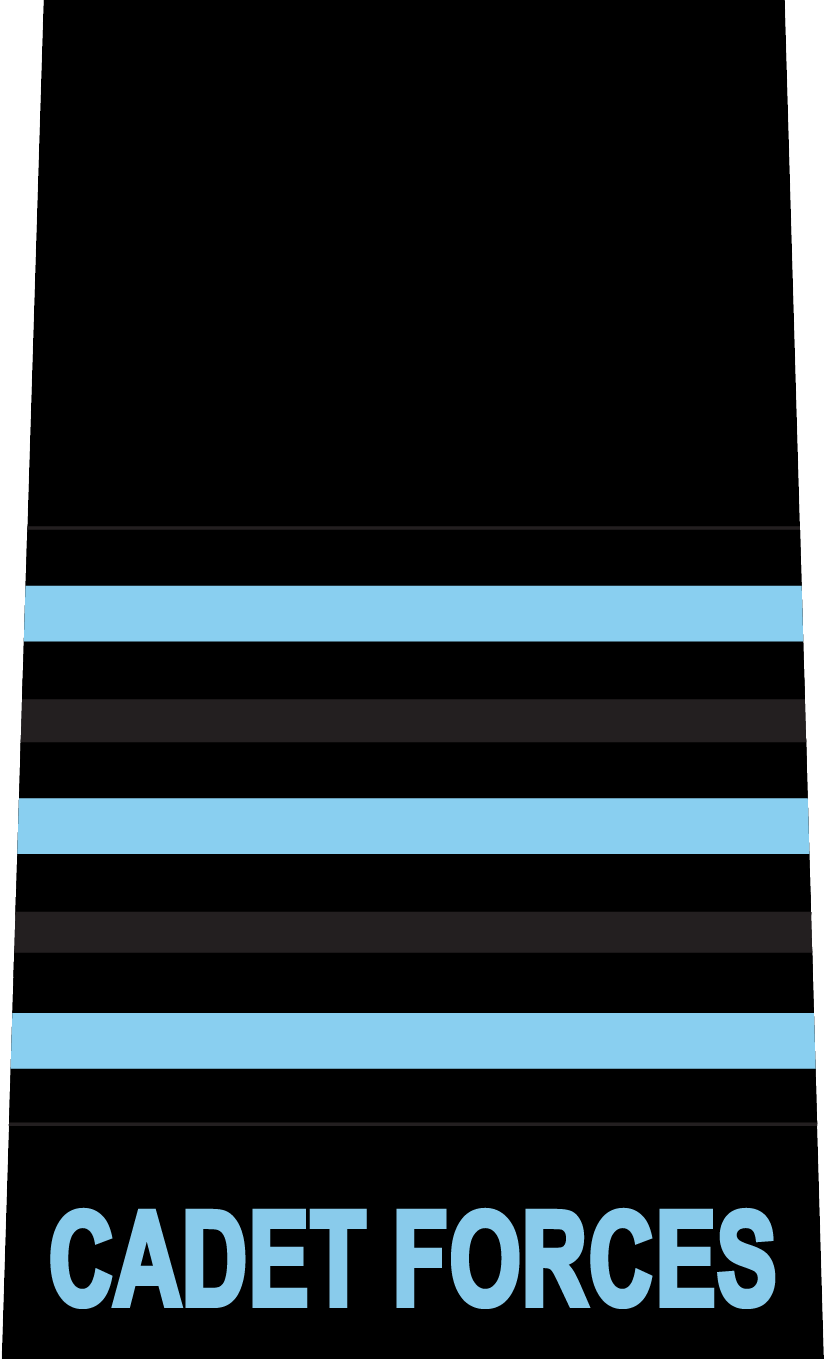
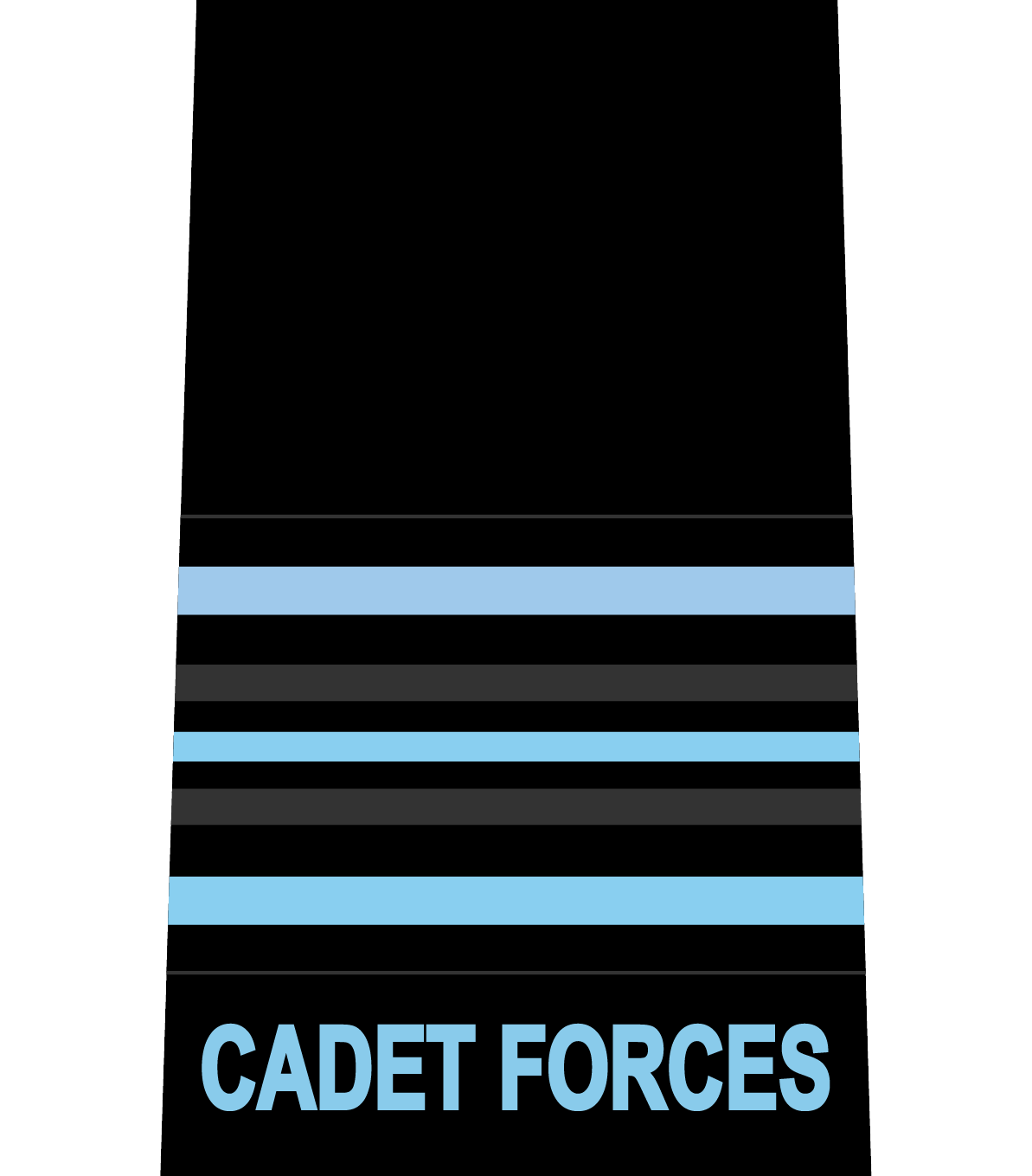
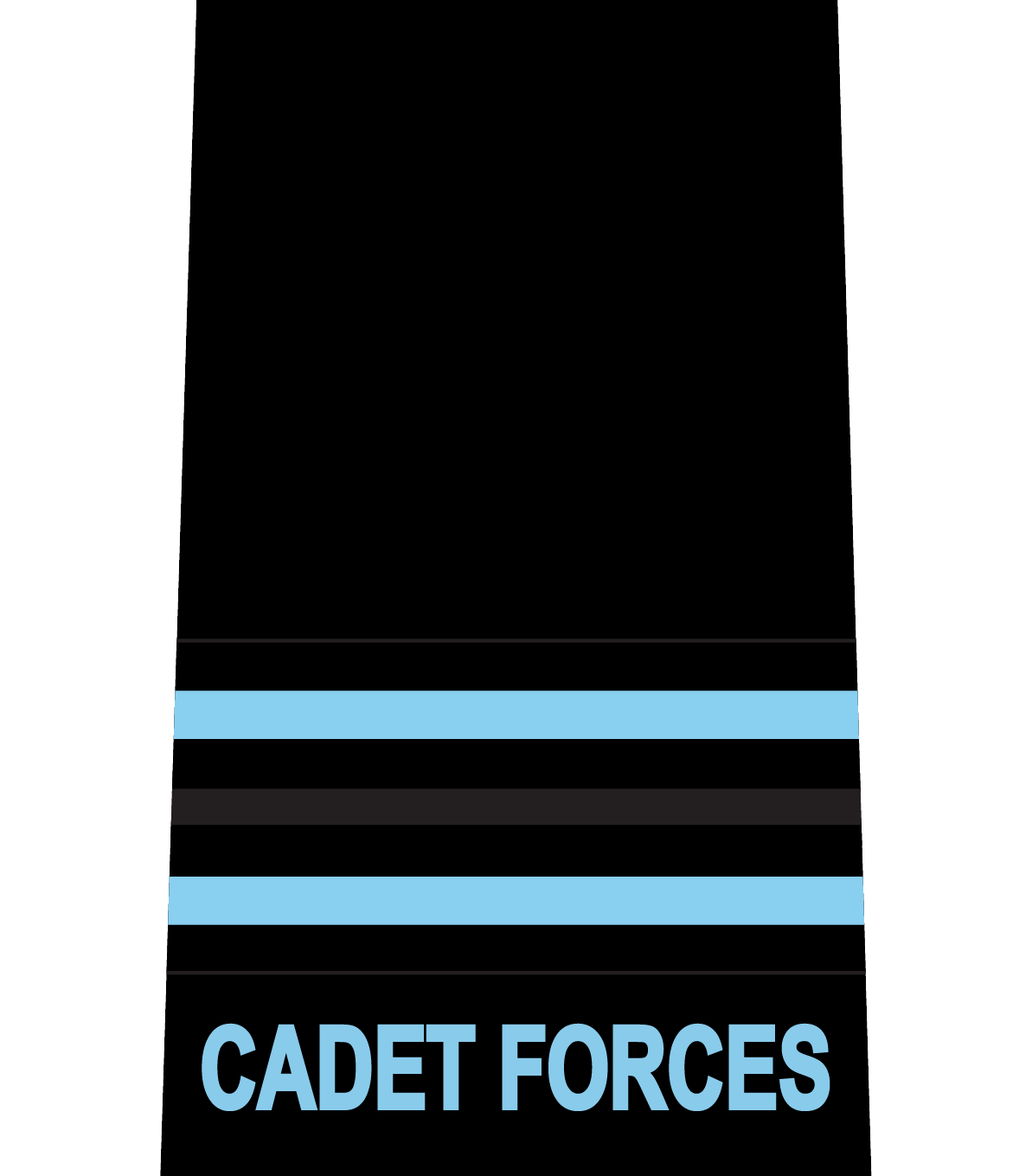
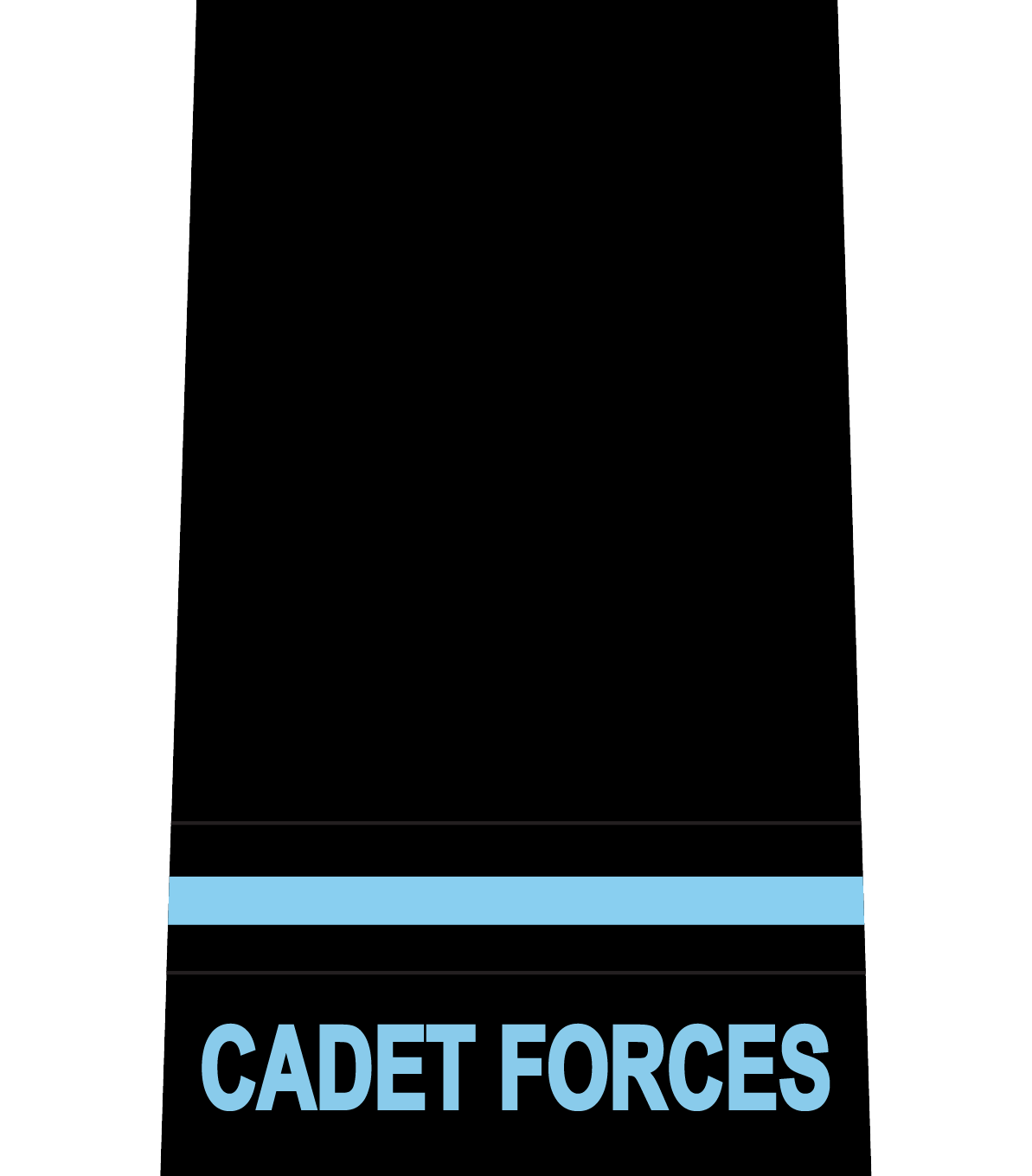
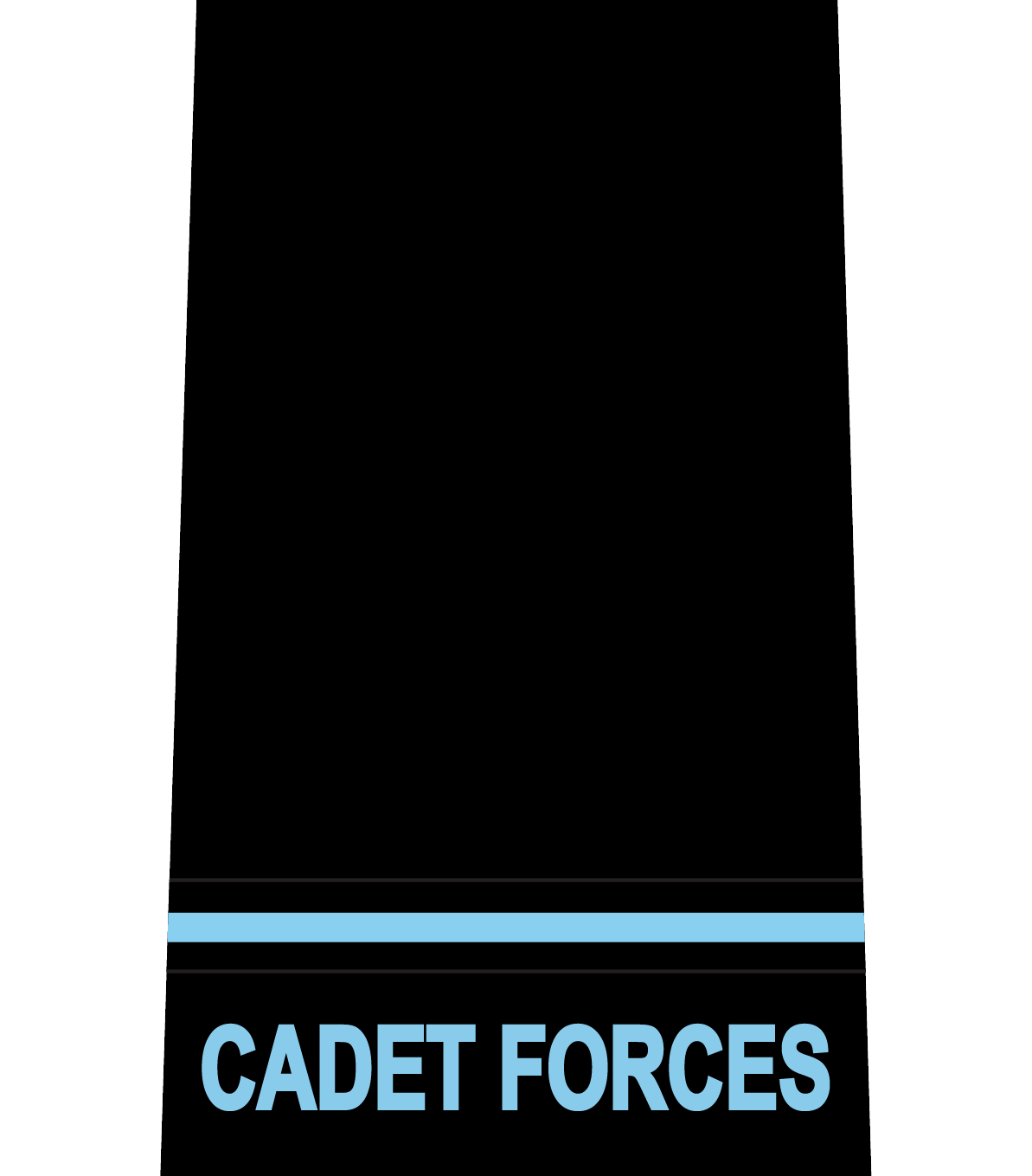
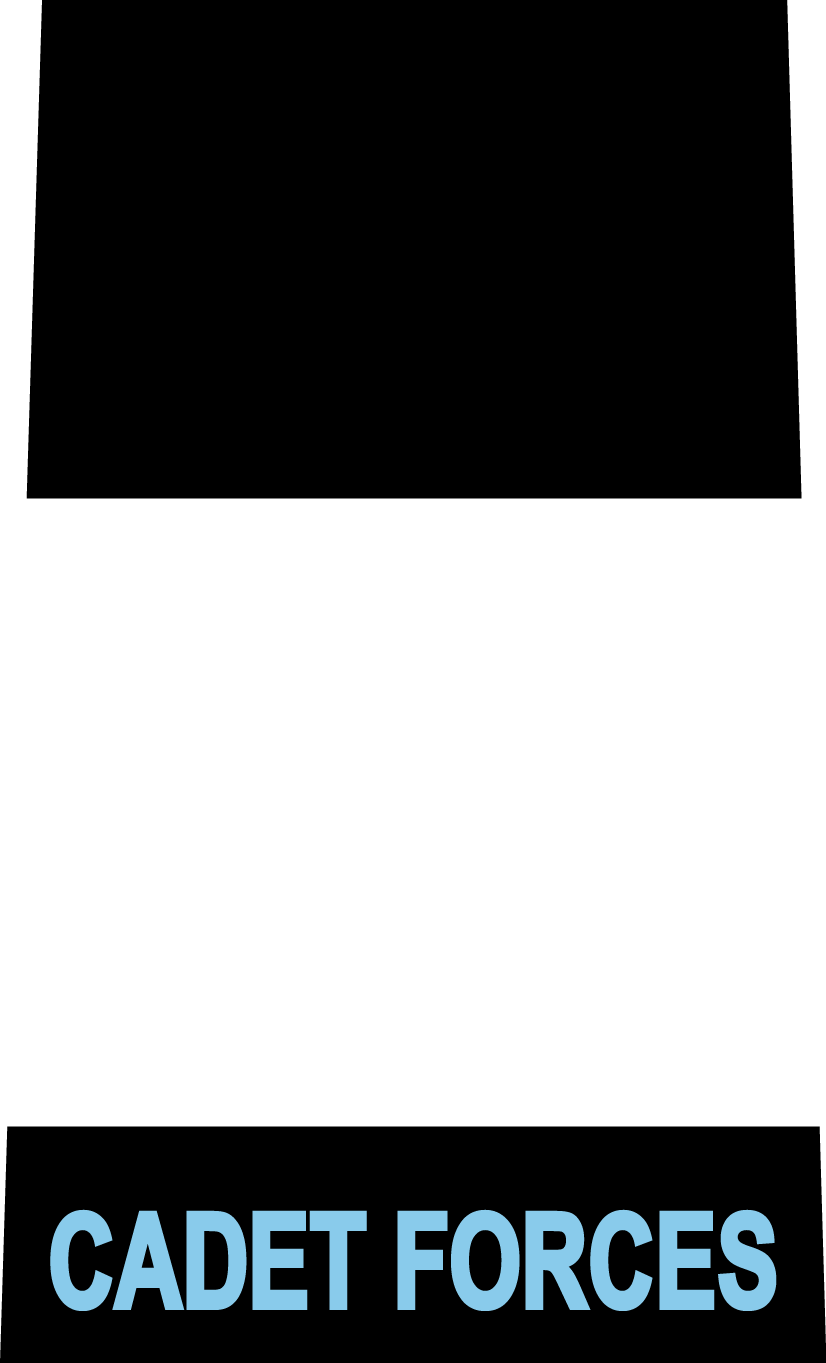
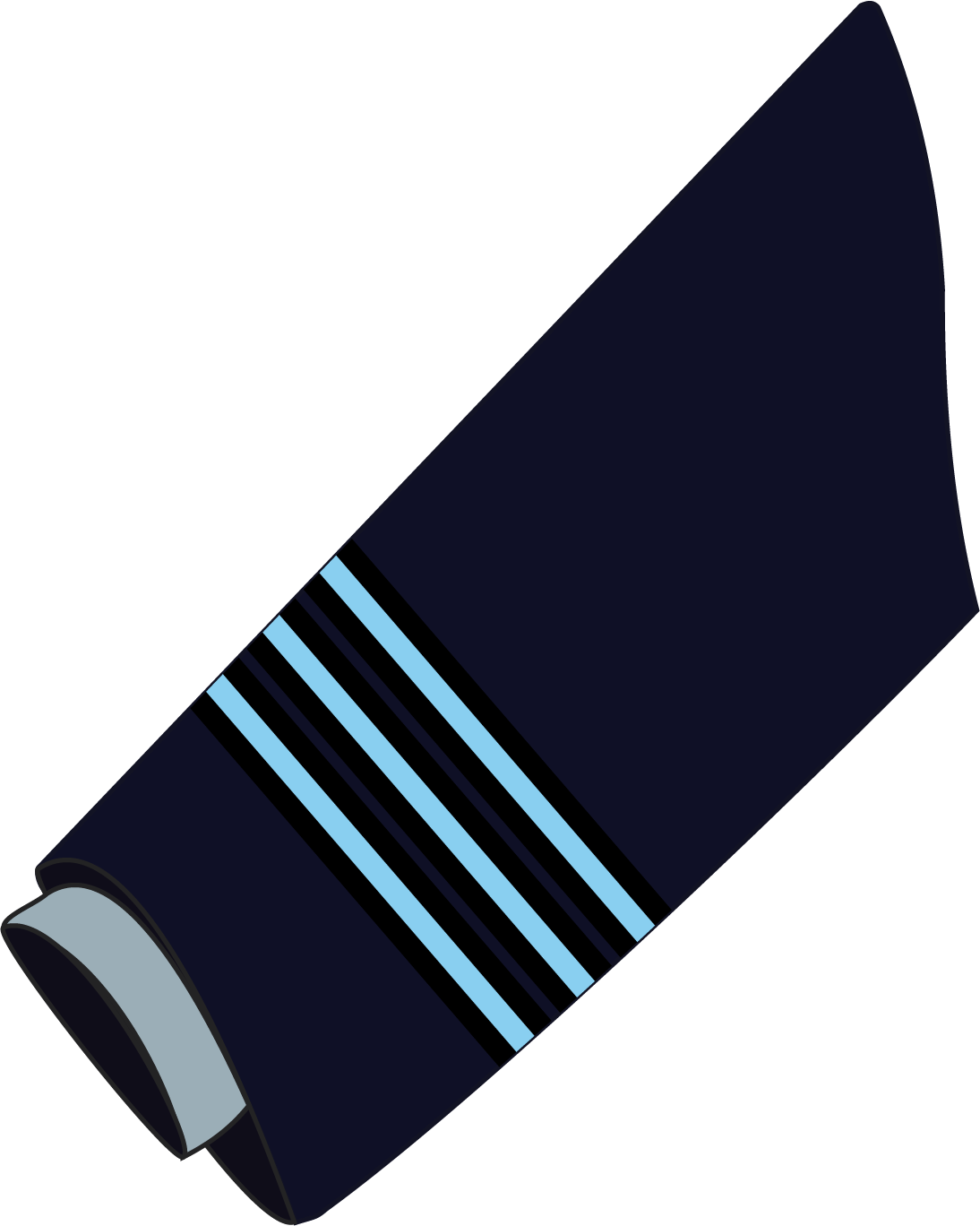
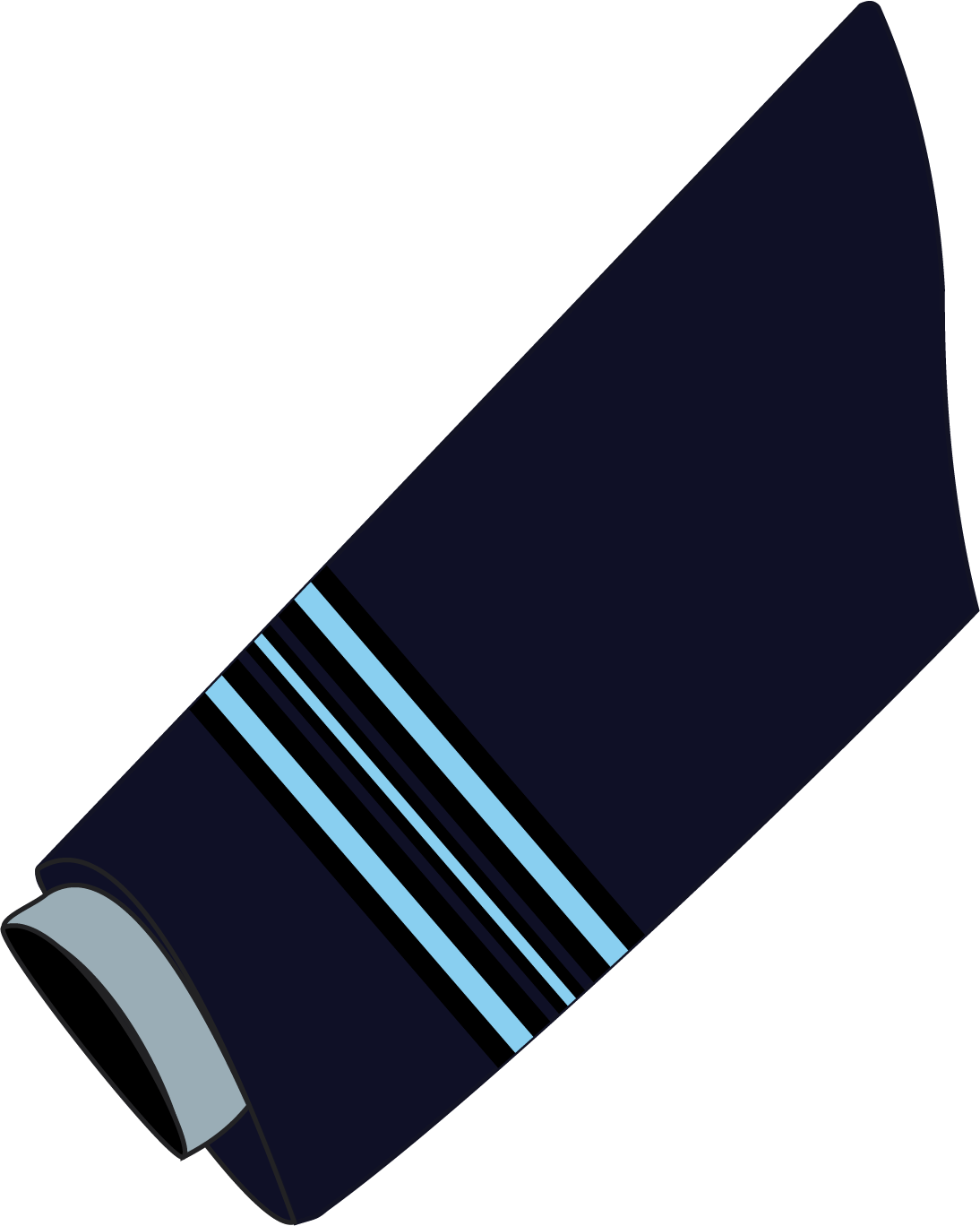
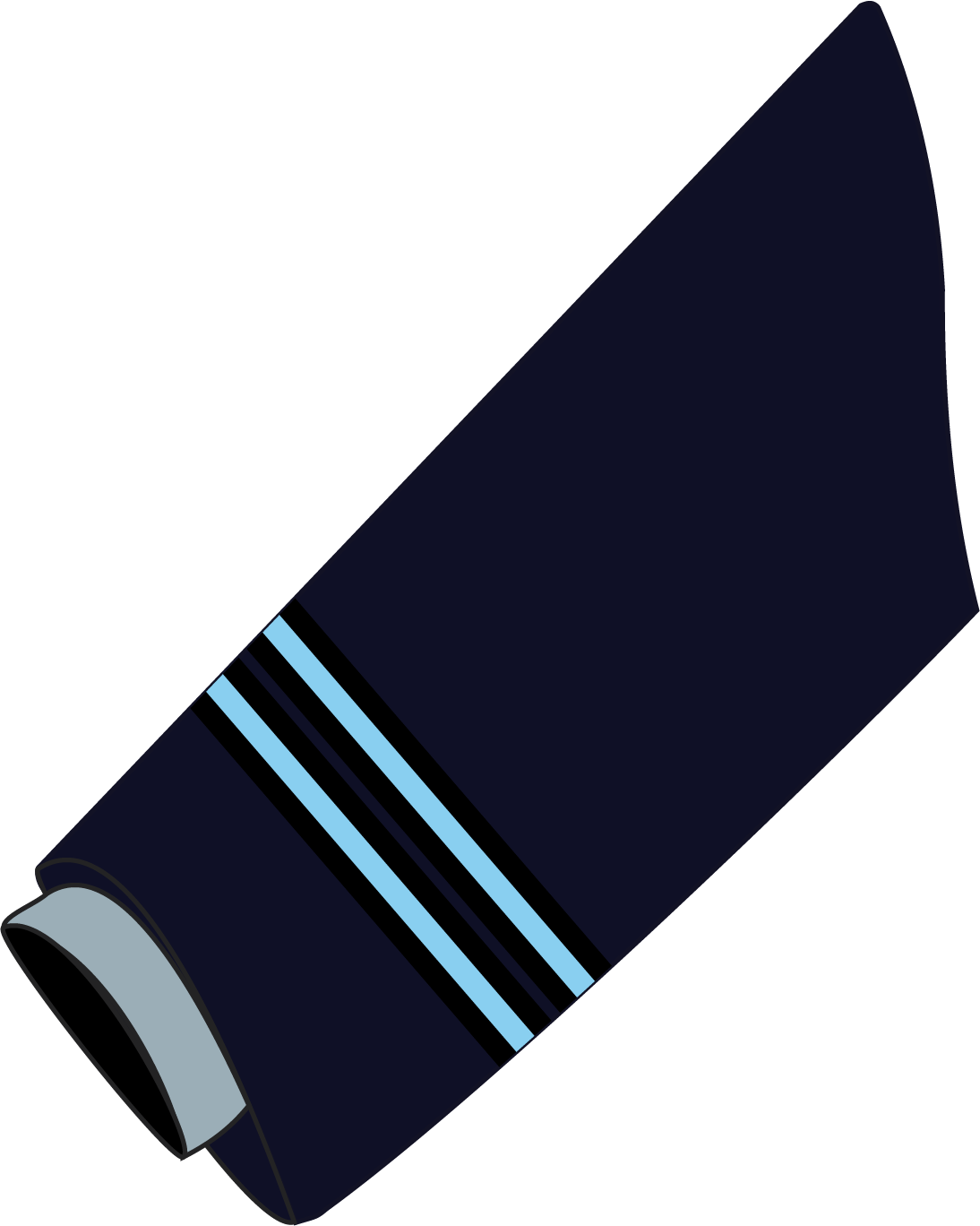
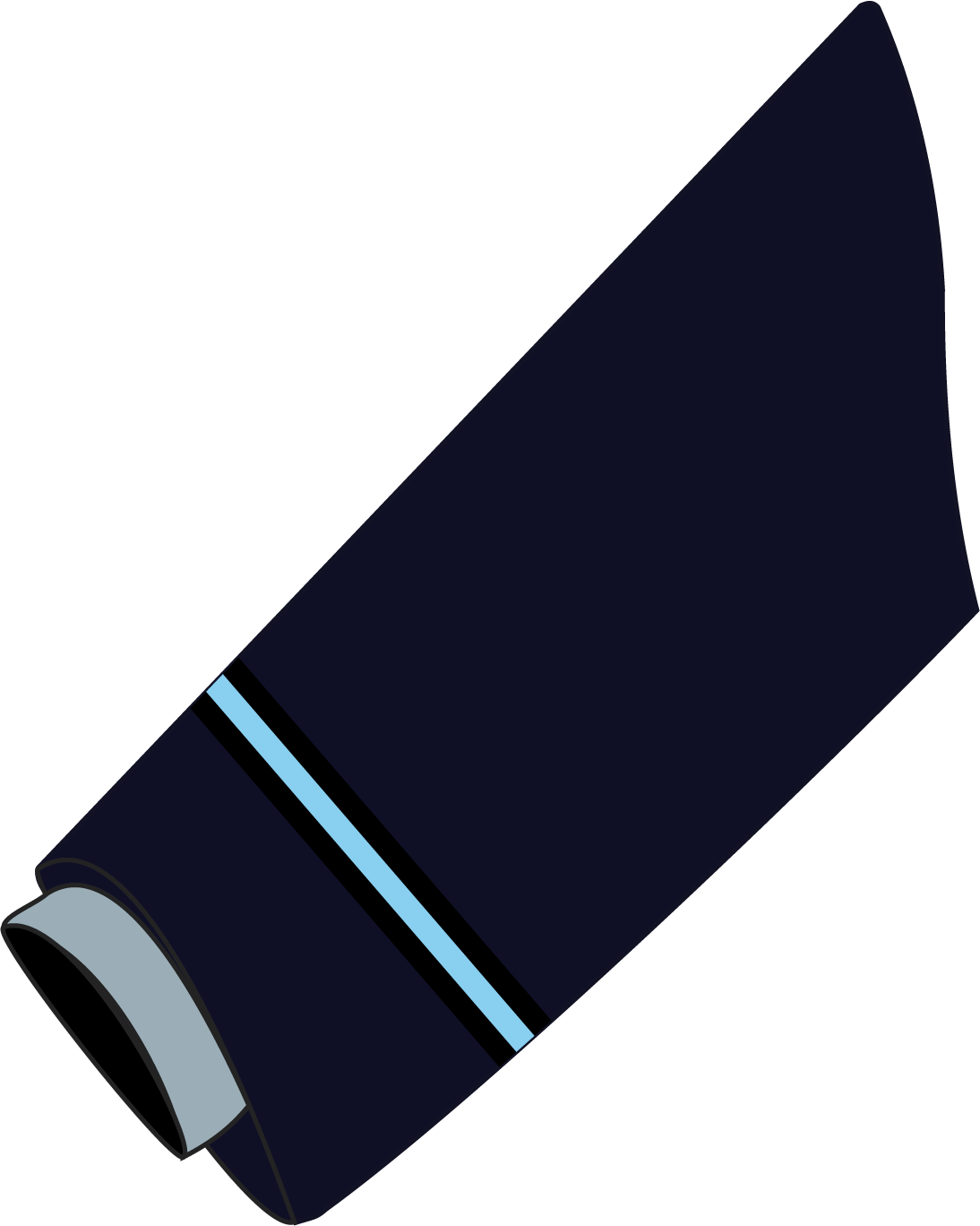
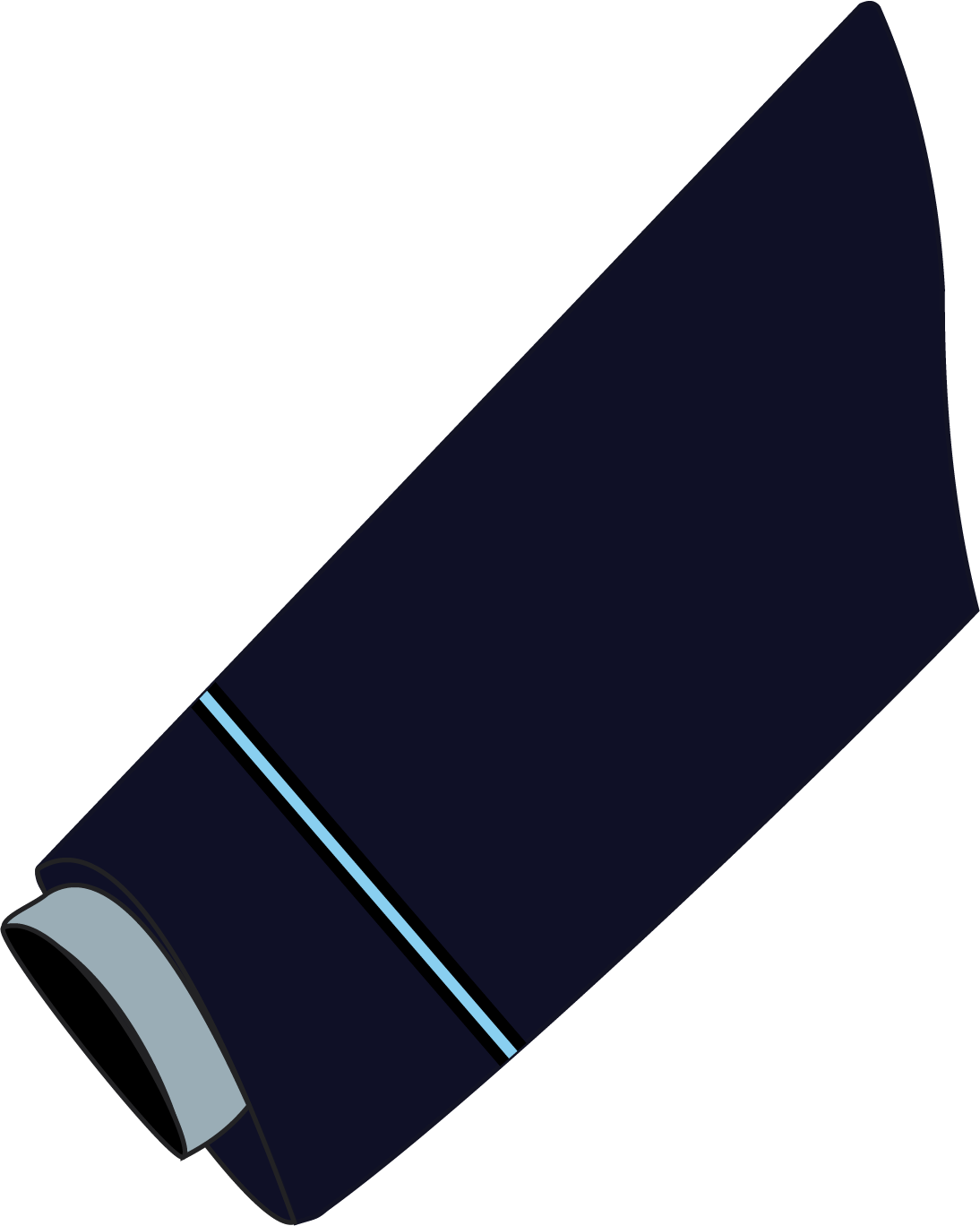
NZCF Officers	OFF 6	OFF 5	OFF 4	OFF 3	OFF 2	OFF 1
New Zealand Air Training Corps
New Zealand Air Training Corps						No Insignia
New Zealand Air Training Corps	Wing; Commander	Squadron; Leader	Flight; Lieutenant	Flying; Officer	Pilot; Officer	Officer cadet
New Zealand Air Training Corps	WGCDR	SQNLDR	FLTLT	FGOFF	PLTOFF	OFFCDT

While New Zealand Cadet Forces Officers hold commissions on behalf the New Zealand Parliament, via the Minister of Defence, they are not entitled to be saluted by New Zealand Defence Force personnel. Due to the rank emblems being identical other than the "New Zealand" and "Cadet Forces" identifiers, occasionally Cadet Force Officers are saluted by NZDF personnel. If this happens, Cadet Force Officers are encouraged to return the salute to be polite.

New Zealand Cadet Force Officers do not hold precedence of rank over NZDF personnel e.g. a Cadet Force Squadron leader has no authority to issue orders to a NZDF Pilot Officer or Non-Commissioned Officer.

New Zealand Cadet Force Officers continue to undergo training throughout their career, following the yet to be released NZCF 170O.

== Membership ==
=== Cadet members ===
Interested personnel can join between the ages of 13 and 15 (or if attending the first year of high school) and can stay on without being promoted to the age of 18. Senior Non-Commissioned Officers may serve until their 20th birthday.

Other than black lace up shoes, all uniform is provided upon enrolment into a unit and completion of a training camp where wearing of the uniform is taught. Bonds are sometimes held to ensure uniforms are returned.

==== Fees ====
Unit fees are set by each unit Parent Support Committee annually. Due to fluctuating operating costs, these vary from unit to unit dependent on the type of activities the unit has planned, although typically fees will be no more than $200 annually.

=== Adult members ===
==== Adult Cadets ====
In 2017 the New Zealand Cadet Forces updated their Child Protection policy surrounding cadets who are either Non-Commissioned Officers or personnel completing cadet level training who are aged 18 and over.

There is a deliberate delineation between an 'Adult' and an 'Officer' as the latter has specific authority to exercise command and control over cadets and other NZCF Officers.

The key difference between a cadet who is an adult and a cadet who is under 18 is that adult cadets, and indeed all adults within the New Zealand Cadet Forces, are charged with the responsibility of maintaining the safety and welfare of cadets during all NZCF activities. While this doesn't mean that cadets who are classified as adults hold authority over other cadets due to their age, it does mean that adult cadets are expected to vocalize to an Officer or Supplementary Staff member when they believe safety or welfare have been compromised.

Cadet Non-Commissioned Officers who are 18 or older are issued a thin white band which is sewn into the rank slide immediately above the "CADET FORCES" lettering and below the rank emblem, and a white stripe is placed vertically on the left hand side of the CWD name badge.

==== Officers and supplementary staff ====
Adult Members can serve in two capacities: Commissioned officers or Supplementary Staff. Officers are commissioned into the New Zealand Cadet Forces, with the post-nominal letters NZCF, at the rank of Pilot Officer, and can be promoted after completing the necessary training and service.

In 2014 the organisation introduced a new position of National Support Officer (NSO). This position was designed to place a New Zealand Cadet Force Officer at a high level of influence within Headquarters NZCF, where traditionally positions were solely occupied by New Zealand Defence Force Personnel. In 2016 with the adoption of the continental staff system the position was renamed to Assistant Commandant. If he or she is an ATC officer, as opposed to an NZCC or SCC officer, they hold the rank of Wing Commander.

Supplementary Staff or SS for short, are civilians who help train cadets. They do not wear uniform but are generally treated similarly to officers by cadets. Members of the NZDF are occasionally attached to cadet units to assist in conducting training. This is normally because they know a cadet/officer in that unit, or they have a particular interest in cadet forces. They are addressed as "Instructor" or by cadets' choice, "Sir" or "Ma'am".

==== Fees ====
Most NZCF officers do not pay any membership fees but many choose to contribute, for example by purchasing stationery and equipment for their unit.

== Activities ==
=== The Duke of Edinburgh's Hillary Award ===
==== Officers and adults ====
Any Commissioned Officer in the NZCF or Supplementary Staff member that has an active security clearance is eligible to become an award facilitator, allowing cadets within their unit to actively participate in the award and allows any progress towards the award to be signed off. There is no limit to the number of staff members who can be award facilitators, allowing larger units to focus a staff member to each section of the award.

While the award is directed towards young adults within the NZCF, any adults under the age of 25 are eligible to complete any of the awards (although the Gold award would be the most reasonable).

==== Cadet participation ====
Run in partnership with the Duke of Edinburgh's Hillary Awards organisation, the award is a multi-year, voluntary, non-competitive programme of practical, cultural and adventurous activities, designed to support the personal and social development of young people aged 14–25, regardless of gender, background or ability. It offers an individual challenge and encourages young people to undertake exciting, constructive, challenging and enjoyable activities in their free time.

Personnel undertaking the award can begin the activity either through their school, a third party provider, or the New Zealand Cadet Forces with more than 9,000 young adults undertaking the programme each year.

Within the frame of the New Zealand Cadet Forces, parade nights and community service events like Anzac Day parades can count towards the service requirement, while weekend camps and courses can count towards the skill section of the awards. The Cadet Fieldcraft Activity can also count towards the Adventurous Journey for all three awards. Cadets are able to retrospectively claim up to 3 months of work they've done before signing up for their first award. For example, if a cadet completed a NZCF promotional course such as the Senior Non-Commissioned Officer Course shortly before signing up for an award, then they would be able to retroactively use the course for their residential project.

Cadets that successfully complete an award are entitled to wear the pin of the highest award they receive on their brassard.

Year	Bronze	Silver	Gold
Description	Bronze is the first level of The Award. For your Bronze Award you need to complete 13 hours of two sections and 26 hours of one section.	Silver is the second level of the Award. For Silver you need to complete 26 hours of each section if you have completed bronze and an additional 13 hours if you haven't.	Gold is the highest level of The Award. For Gold you need to complete 12 months of each section if you have completed silver and an additional 26 hours if you haven't. At gold you also need to complete the Residential Project.
Eligibility	You Can start the bronze award in the year you turn 14.	You can start your silver once you have completed bronze or are 15	You can start gold as soon as you are 16

=== Parade Nights ===
Every unit holds Parade Nights around 2–4 hours long each week during school terms. Parade nights usually begin and end with a parade. The starting parade is used to raise the RNZAF ensign, to inspect uniforms, and to inform the cadets of the parade night's activities. The final parade is used to lower the RNZAF ensign. Cadets are then informed either during parade or at a debrief of upcoming events in the unit. Between the parades, cadets undergo classroom or practical instruction.

=== Flying ===
Units teach aviation theory as part of the parade nights and units typically organise practical Flying Training for cadets in partnership with local Aero Clubs. There is an annual National Aviation Course, consisting of separate Flying and Navigation flights. Those that opt for the Flying component spend two weeks covering both theory and practical lessons in flying, with First Solo being a common achievement for those over 16 years of age. The Navigation component is a 1-week-long theoretical and practical course covering the NZ CAA Private Pilot Licence syllabus. The practical content includes 4 navigation flights building up from an initial 30-minute map reading exercise to a full two-hour Navigation exercise covering up to 100 nautical miles (190 km) distance. As of 2021 the cost of attending the aviation courses for Air Cadets has increased, with the cost per person for those attending the two courses required to pay the following:

- National Power Flying Course – $1,000 (NZD), up from $650 that had previously been charged (which was unadjusted for 6 years).
- National Navigation Course – $440 (NZD)

=== Gliding ===
As with Flying, Gliding Training is organised by the unit in partnership with local gliding clubs. There is an annual week-long Gliding Course, which is held at Matamata aerodrome. Cadets from all over New Zealand may attend this week-long course. As of 2021 the course costs $550.

=== Field craft activity ===
Most units conduct classroom training in bushcraft and survival skills and hold regular Basic and Advanced bushcraft camps in the local area during weekends. The Cadet Fieldcraft activity, renamed and reshaped from the all encompassing 'bushcraft course', is a nine-day course that provides Cadets with an enhanced practical experience in field craft to further their outdoor skills training. The cadet section of the course allows between 30 and 60 cadets to travel around the country to meet and interact with cadets from other squadrons. Separately the course serves to train Commissioned Officers to lead and manage cadets on day tramps and/or overnight camps on clearly formed tracks in and below the bush line. Officers are taught leadership, risk and crisis management, bush craft skills, and first aid.

The course is held either at RNZAF Dip Flat in the South Island, Waiouru Army base in the North Island, or occasionally Tekapo Army Camp south west of Christchurch.

=== Shooting ===
Units conduct regular range training with small-bore rifles. Some units have their own armories and ranges at their parade hall. Cadets must pass a Dry Firing Training Test (DFTT) before being allowed on the range. Cadets who achieve high marks regularly on the range may be awarded a marksmanship badge to be worn on their brassard.

=== Public service ===
Each year the New Zealand Cadet Forces participate in numerous public service events around the country. Anzac Day represents the most public and personnel-intensive deployment for cadet forces, often involving the bulk of the unit's forces. Cadets will form cenotaph and catafalque parties on behalf of, and in partnership with the New Zealand Defence Force.

Another high-profile public service is the annual Poppy Day drive by the Royal New Zealand Returned and Services' Association (RNRSA), where cadets and RSA members work together to raise funds towards helping New Zealand Veterans and the RNRSA.

=== International Air Cadet Exchange (IACE) ===
The International Air Cadet Exchange is an annual exchange programme organised by the International Air Cadet Exchange Association. Each year the New Zealand Air Training Corps sends a dozen members of the organisation to countries all over the world. The participants can be any rank and a Commissioned NZCF Officer accompanies each group of cadets overseas, providing opportunities for both adult and youth members.

== Local training ==
=== Cadets ===
Each Squadron trains at least one night per week at a "parade night" in order to undertake the Cadet Development Framework Each squadron employs a training officer whose role is to create and implement a local training programme. The Cadet Development Framework is a four-year programme which provides cadets with the opportunity to develop skills in leadership, aviation knowledge, drill, firearms training, fieldcraft, and more.

The programme provides standardisation for training and expected development within Cadet Units for CDT – CDTW/O. Some content is applicable to all three Corps of the NZCF, whilst some is specific to particular Corps.

The content of the Four-Year Training Programme is not designed to fill every period during parade nights in a calendar year, but intentionally leaves scope for Cadet Unit Commanders to add content that will add value to their communities, strengthen Unit identity and provide opportunities for cadets that they may not receive outside of NZCF. However, only completion of the prescribed training will ensure that cadets can continue moving through the development model. Delivery of the content of the Four-Year Training Programme is at the Cadet Unit Commander's discretion. In time, further resources to assist in delivery will be developed, including parade night lesson plans, instructor guides and additional resources. Where gaps in knowledge or skills exist, Area Advisors and/or Area Support Officers should be engaged.

The training is split into three different levels off learning that correspond with a cadet's progression.

- Lead Self – Years 1-2
- Lead Teams – Year 3+
- Lead Leaders – Year 4+

Junior Cadets Training
Year One Cadets – Basic One		Year Two Cadets – Basic Two		Year Three Cadets – Proficiency	
To achieve the Basic 1 badge a cadet must complete the following first year subjects.	Lessons	To achieve the Basic 2 badge a cadet must complete the following second year subjects.	Lessons	To achieve the Proficiency badge a cadet must complete the following third year subjects.	Lessons
BSH – Bushcraft	1.1-1.9	BSH – Bushcraft	2.1-2.3	BSH – Bushcraft	3.1-3.4
DRL – Drill	1.1-1.14	DRL – Drill	2.1-2.9	DRL – Drill	3.1-3.7
ETH – Ethics & Safety	1.1-1.5	FAS – Firearms Safety & Marksmanship	2.1-2.4	FAS – Firearms Safety & Marksmanship	3.1
FAS – Firearms Safety & Marksmanship	1.1-1.5	LDR – Leadership, Communication & Management	2.1-2.2	LDR – Leadership, Communication & Management	3.1-3.5
LDR – Leadership, Communication & Management	1.1	MED – Health & Medical	2.1-2.6	MED – Health & Medical	3.1-3.4
MED – Health & Medical	1.1	NAV – Navigation	2.1-2.6	NAV – Navigation	3.1-3.3
NAV – Navigation	1.1-1.10	OPS – Operations, Traditions, History	2.1-2.11	OPS – Operations, Traditions, History	3.1-3.9
OPS – Operations, Traditions, History	1.1-1.13	PHY – Physical & Adventurous Training	2.1-2.2	RCD – Radio, Cyber, Drones	3.1-3.2
PHY – Physical & Adventurous Training	1.1-1.6	AVS – Aviation Studies	2.1-2.3	SAL – Systems Approach to Learning	3.1-3.11
RCD – Radio, Cyber, Drones	1.1-1.5			AVS – Aviation Studies	3.1-3.3
AVS – Aviation Studies	1-7				

Senior Cadets / Non Commissioned Officer Training
Year Four Cadets – Advanced		Additional Training	
To achieve the Advanced badge a cadet must complete the following fourth year subjects.	Lessons	Suggested additional training subject to unit availability to participate.	Lessons
ETH – Ethics & Safety	4.1	DRL – Drill	5.1-5.6
EXP – Exercise Planning & Risk Management	4.1-4.14	OPS – Operations, Traditions, History	5.1-5.2
LDR – Leadership, Communication & Management	4.1-4.9	PHY – Physical & Adventurous Training	5.1-5.2
OPS – Operations, Traditions, History	4.1-4.2	MED – Health & Medical	5.1
SAL – Systems Approach to Learning	4.1-4.5	RCD – Radio, Cyber, Drones	5.1-5.3

== Competitions ==
=== Aviation Skills Competition ===
The Aviation Skills Competition (AVSKILLS), is a set of three competitions held across New Zealand, each open to ATC squadrons in their area. This is followed by a national competition, pitting the three winners against each other to determine the top squadron in the country. The competition aims to test cadets on their teamwork, comradeship and capabilities. Cadets are tested on various aspects of their training, including rifle shooting, general service knowledge & cadet forces knowledge (knowledge of the NZDF and NZCF respectively), first aid, drill and navigation.

Air Cadet Aviation Skills Competition Winners
Year	Area AVSKILLS Winner			National AVSKILLS Winner	National AVSKILLS Location	Notes
Year	Northern	Central	Southern	National AVSKILLS Winner	National AVSKILLS Location	Notes
2024	No. 30 (Hobsonville) Squadron	No. 11 (District of Hastings) Squadron	No. 17 (City of Christchurch) Squadron	No. 17 (City of Christchurch) Squadron	RNZAF Base Woodbourne	
2023	No. 30 (Hobsonville) Squadron	No. 11 (District of Hastings) Squadron	No. 17 (City of Christchurch) Squadron	No. 17 (City of Christchurch) Squadron	RNZAF Base Woodbourne	
2022	No. 30 (Hobsonville) Squadron	No. 32 (Borough of Feilding) Squadron	No. 17 (City of Christchurch) Squadron	No. 17 (City of Christchurch) Squadron	RNZAF Base Auckland	
2021	No. 30 (Hobsonville) Squadron	No. 1 (City of Wellington) Squadron			RNZAF Base Woodbourne	
2020	No Team Entered	No. 32 (Borough of Feilding) Squadron	No. 17 (City of Christchurch) Squadron	No. 17 (City of Christchurch) Squadron	RNZAF Base Woodbourne	No Northern Area team entered due to COVID-19
2019	No. 19 (Auckland) Squadron	No. 32 (Borough of Feilding) Squadron	No. 17 (City of Christchurch) Squadron	No. 17 (City of Christchurch) Squadron	RNZAF Base Woodbourne	
2018	No. 19 (Auckland) Squadron	No. 32 (Borough of Feilding) Squadron	No. 17 (City of Christchurch) Squadron	No. 17 (City of Christchurch) Squadron	RNZAF Base Ohakea	Inaugural Year

=== Air League Trophy – Area and national efficiency competition ===
At some point in the year, nominated squadrons are inspected by their Area Co-ordinator. They judge them on their standards of drill, knowledge of the ATC curriculum, and general efficiency in running the unit. The three winning squadrons are then inspected by New Zealand Defence Force staff who determine the most efficient unit nationally. Units that win the national competition are awarded the Air League Trophy.

=== Davy Memorial Drill Competition ===
The Davy Drill Competition is a Ceremonial Drill competition held annually, in each of the three areas. The competition is only open to the ATC and must consist of no less than 12 people in a marching formation, with one parade commander, which is to be of Senior NCO rank. The winner of each area's competition moves onto the National Competition. The winner of the National competition wins the Davy Memorial Trophy, which was donated in memoriam of Hr. H.A.C Davy, who was the Dominion President of the Air Training Corps Association for a number of years.

Year	Winning Squadron	Area	Notes
2024	No. 11 (District of Hastings) Squadron	Central	
2023	No. 30 (Hobsonville) Squadron	Northern	
2022	No. 30 (Hobsonville) Squadron	Northern	
2021	No competition was held due to COVID-19 restrictions.		
2020	No. 32 (Borough of Feilding) Squadron	Central	
2019	No. 17 (City of Christchurch) Squadron	Southern	
2018	No. 10 (City of Palmerston North) Squadron	Central	
2017	No. 19 (Auckland) Squadron	Northern	
2016	No. 19 (Auckland) Squadron	Northern	
2015	No. 10 (City of Palmerston North) Squadron	Central	
2014	No. 3 (City of Auckland) Squadron	Northern	
2013	No. 10 (City of Palmerston North) Squadron	Central	
2012	No. 3 (City of Auckland) Squadron	Northern	
2011	No. 3 (City of Auckland) Squadron	Northern	
2010	No. 11 (District of Hastings) Squadron	Central	
2009	No. 17 (City of Christchurch) Squadron	Southern	
2008	No. 3 (City of Auckland) Squadron	Northern	
2007	No. 41 (City of Porirua) Squadron	Central	
2006	Unknown		
2005	Unknown		
2004	Unknown		
2003	Unknown		
2002	No. 35 (Whakatane) Squadron	Northern	
2001	No. 35 (Whakatane) Squadron	Northern	
2000	Unknown		
1999	Unknown		
1998	No. 1 (City of Wellington) Squadron	Central	
1997	No. 11 (District of Hastings) Squadron	Central	
1996	No. 11 (District of Hastings) Squadron	Central	
1995	No. 42 (City of Dunedin) Squadron	Southern	
1994	No. 30 (Hobsonville) Squadron	Northern	
1993	11 SQN, 30 SQN, 5 SQN		
1992	No. 5 (Rodney District) Squadron	Northern	
1991	No. 19 (Auckland) Squadron	Northern	
1990	No. 11 (District of Hastings) Squadron	Central	
1989	No. 11 (District of Hastings) Squadron	Central	
1988	No. 11 (District of Hastings) Squadron	Central	
1987	No. 11 (District of Hastings) Squadron	Central	
1986	No. 3 (City of Auckland) Squadron	Northern	
1985	No. 3 (City of Auckland) Squadron	Northern	
1984	No. 3 (City of Auckland) Squadron	Northern	
1983	No. 17 (City of Christchurch) Squadron	Southern	
1982	No. 41 (City of Porirua) Squadron	Central	
1981	No. 37 (Thames) Squadron	Northern	
1980	No. 17 (City of Christchurch) Squadron	Southern	
1979	No. 5 (Rodney District) Squadron	Northern	
1978	No. 9 (City of Wanganui) Squadron	Central	
1977	No. 19 (Auckland) Squadron	Northern	
1976	No. 5 (Rodney District) Squadron	Northern	
1975	No. 5 (Rodney District) Squadron	Northern	
1974	No. 3 (City of Auckland) Squadron	Northern	
1973	No. 30 (Hobsonville) Squadron	Northern	
1972	Unknown		
1971	No. 47 (District of Hawera) Squadron	Central	Unit no longer exists
1970	No. 11 (District of Hastings) Squadron	Central	
1969	No. 5 (Rodney District) Squadron	Northern	
1968	No. 5 (Rodney District) Squadron	Northern	
1967	No. 10 (City of Palmerston North) Squadron	Central	
1966	No. 3 (City of Auckland) Squadron	Northern	
1965	No. 23 (Nelson) Squadron	Southern	
1964	No. 1 (City of Wellington) Squadron	Central	
1963	No. 3 (City of Auckland) Squadron	Northern	
1962	No. 5 (Rodney District) Squadron	Northern	
1961	Auckland	Northern	
1960	Greymouth	Southern	
1959	Auckland	Northern	

=== Shooting Competitions ===
==== Wallingford Shooting Competition ====
Year	Winning Squadron	Area
2024	Unknown	
2023	No. 3 (City of Auckland) Squadron	Northern
2022	No. 3 (City of Auckland) Squadron	Northern
2021	No. 3 (City of Auckland) Squadron	Northern
2020	No. 13 (City of Napier) Squadron	Northern
2019	No. 3 (City of Auckland) Squadron	Northern
2018	No. 3 (City of Auckland) Squadron	Northern
2017	No. 19 (Auckland) Squadron	Northern
2016	No. 19 (Auckland) Squadron	Northern
2015	No. 3 (City of Auckland) Squadron	Northern
2014	No. 19 (Auckland) Squadron	Northern
2013	No. 19 (Auckland) Squadron	Northern
2012	No. 7 (City of Hamilton) Squadron / No. 19 (Auckland) Squadron	Northern
2011	No. 19 (Auckland) Squadron	Northern
2010	No. 16 (District of Tauranga) Squadron	Northern
2009	No. 36 (Greymouth) Squadron	Southern
2008	No. 31 (Morrinsville) squadron	Northern
2007	No. 16 (District of Tauranga) Squadron	Northern
2006	No. 16 (District of Tauranga) Squadron	Northern
2005	No. 16 (District of Tauranga) Squadron	Northern
2004	No. 16 (District of Tauranga) Squadron	Northern
2003	No. 16 (District of Tauranga) Squadron	Northern
2002	No. 31 (Morrinsville) squadron	Northern
2001	No. 16 (District of Tauranga) Squadron	Northern
2000	No. 16 (District of Tauranga) Squadron	Northern
1999	No. 16 (District of Tauranga) Squadron	Northern
1998	No. 16 (District of Tauranga) Squadron	Northern
1997	No. 38 (Wigram) Squadron	Southern
1996	No. 38 (Wigram) Squadron	Southern
1995	No. 13 (City of Napier) Squadron	Central
1994	No. 31 (Morrinsville) squadron	Northern
1993	No. 27 (Blenheim) Squadron	Southern
1992	No. 27 (Blenheim) Squadron	Southern
1991	No. 6 (North Shore) Squadron	Northern
1990	No. 2 (Hutt City) Squadron	Central
1989	No. 6 (North Shore) Squadron	Northern
1988	No. 21 (Masterton District) Squadron	Central
1987	No. 21 (Masterton District) Squadron	Central
1986	No. 21 (Masterton District) Squadron	Central
1985	No. 21 (Masterton District) Squadron	Central
1984	No. 6 (North Shore) Squadron	Northern
1983	No. 18 (Avon) Squadron	Southern
1982	No. 6 (North Shore) Squadron	Northern
1981	No. 18 (Avon) Squadron	Southern
1980	No. 18 (Avon) Squadron	Southern
1979	No. 18 (Avon) Squadron	Southern
1978	No. 30 (Hobbsonville) Squadron	Southern
1977	Unknown	
1976	Unknown	
1975	No. 11 (District of Hastings) Squadron	Central
1974	No. 20 (City of Whangarei) Squadron	Northern
1973	No. 20 (City of Whangarei) Squadron	Northern
1972	No. 20 (City of Whangarei) Squadron	Northern
1971	No. 21 (Masterton District) Squadron	Central
1970	No. 20 (City of Whangarei) Squadron	Northern
1969	Unknown	
1968	No. 1 (City of Wellington) Squadron	Central

The Wallingford Shooting Competition represents the New Zealand Air Training Corps national shooting competition. All NZCF Air Training Corps squadrons are eligible for the competition.

Air Commodore S. Wallingford CB, CBE, who was for many years President of the RNZAF Small Arms Association, donated this trophy for team postal competition to encourage rifle shooting in the Air Training Corps. This cup is awarded to the winning team of the Air Training Corps small-bore postal shoot.

This competition also represents one of a few opportunities for ATC personnel to earn the NZCF Marksman Badge, the others being:

Attained a score of 80% or more during any of the following shoots:

(1) National Smit, Gunson and Wallingford competitions.

(2) Units practicing for the National Smit, Gunson and Wallingford competitions.

(3) Area and National SCC Regattas, NZCC Skills and ATC Skills competitions.

(4) Competition shoots between Cadet Units.

Note: All shoots are to be conducted under the same rules as the National Shooting Competitions.

Air Training Corps Shooting Badges
	Competency Badge	First Class Shot Badge	Marksman Badge
Criteria	60% Score (≥60/100)	70% Score (≥70/100)	80% Score (≥80/100)

==== Ffennell Shooting Competition ====
The Ffennell competitions are a group of small-bore rifle matches for the youth of the Commonwealth. New Zealand Cadet Forces units contest the Class B competitions (using issued rifles and sights). The matches are held under the authority of the Commonwealth Postal Competitions Committee (CPCC). All international correspondence on behalf of the CPCC will be handled by the Council for Cadet Rifle Shooting.

The aim of these team matches is to encourage the Youth of the Commonwealth to participate in the sport of small-bore target rifle shooting.

Entry is open to any unit or sub-unit of the following:

1. New Zealand Cadet Forces;
2. Junior Servicemen of the New Zealand Defence Forces in one establishment; and
3. Other youth groups approved by the CPCC.

Units may enter one or more teams. Each team shall consist of eight firers. A shooter cannot shoot on more than one team. The team captain may or may not be one of these eight. All members of the team must be under the age of 19 years on the day of firing the match, and be serving members of the same unit or sub-unit.

Each team member will fire two cards, 10 rounds to count being fired at each card, with two rounds fired at each aiming mark. Sighting shots will be completed before the practice begins. The whole team need not complete shooting in one day. Highest Possible Score (HPS) is 200. Team HPS is 1600.

== See also ==
- List of squadrons in the New Zealand Air Training Corps
- Cadets (youth program)
