= Uniforms of the New Zealand Army =

The New Zealand Army uniform has changed over the years from that of the original Armed Constabulary of the 1800s to the modern Army Combat Uniform style in use by the majority of world armies today. While British Army influence has always been strong, distinctive New Zealand features have gradually developed. From 2013 the New Zealand Army uniform underwent a complete redesign with a new and distinctive camouflage pattern unique to the NZDF.

== Uniforms of the New Zealand Wars ==
During the New Zealand Wars of 1846–1886, settler militia and Māori allies in a variety of clothing styles served alongside the regulars of the British Imperial forces who wore their red and blue undress uniforms until plain dark blue field uniforms were adopted after 1860. Militia and volunteer uniforms consisted of “blue shirt, a cap similar to that worn by sailors, and any kind of trousers”. Māoris served throughout the wars in the 1860s, generally in tribal groups, or as members of the European volunteer forces. In the later stages of the Land Wars the government passed the Armed Constabulary Act of 1867, replacing both the British regular and local militia regiments. The Armed Constabulary had combined military and police functions and was the forerunner of both the NZ Army and the New Zealand Police. Members wore a blue woollen uniform with black braiding, a red stripe down the trouser seam and either a round "pill box" forage cap or a peaked kepi-like headdress. In the field this was often worn with "shawl dress", including a kilt or Māori Piupiu for convenience in wading across streams and rivers. By 1870 the last British regiment had left New Zealand.

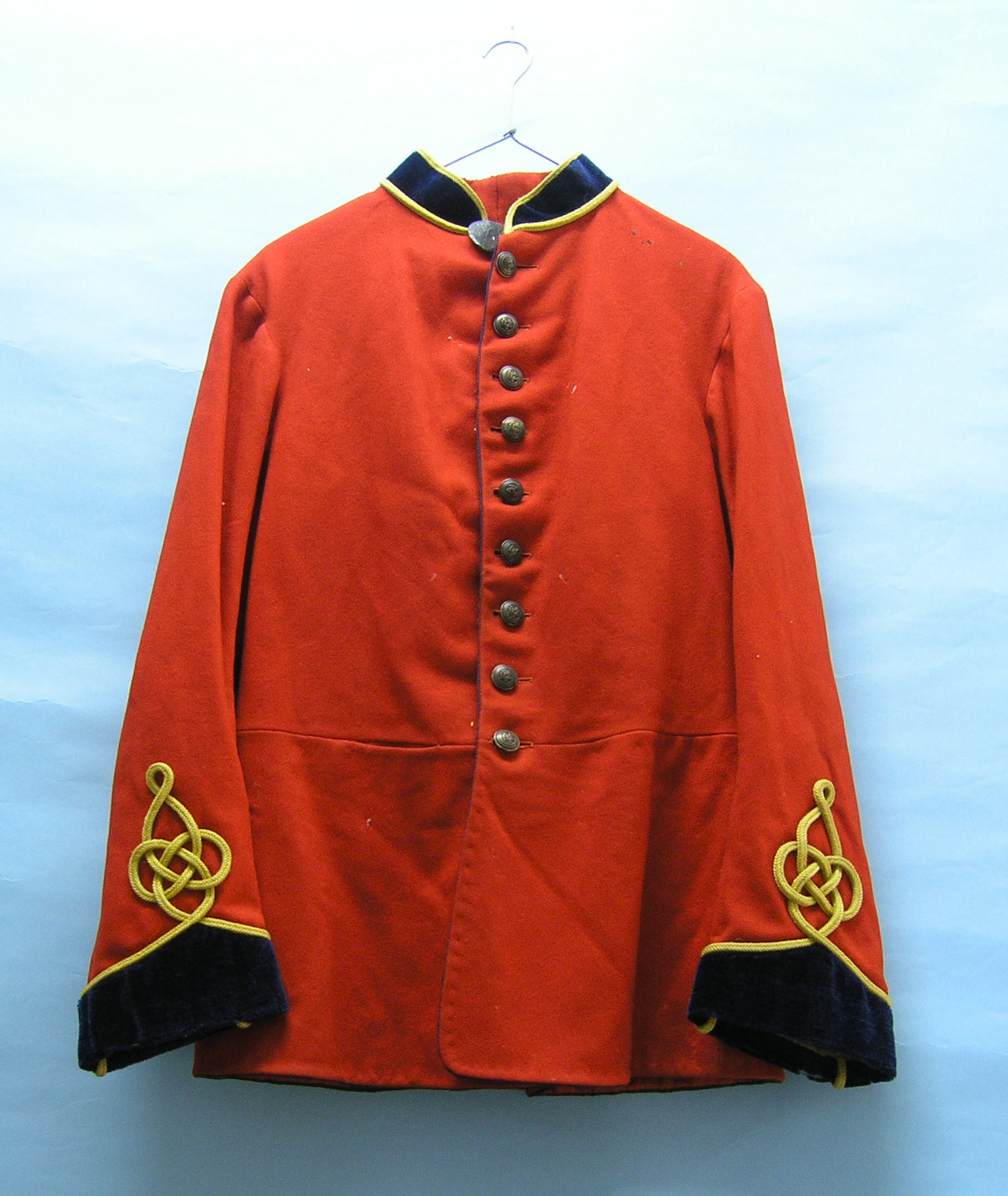
Quarter-Master Sergeant, Auckland Engineer Volunteers, military jacket. 1882

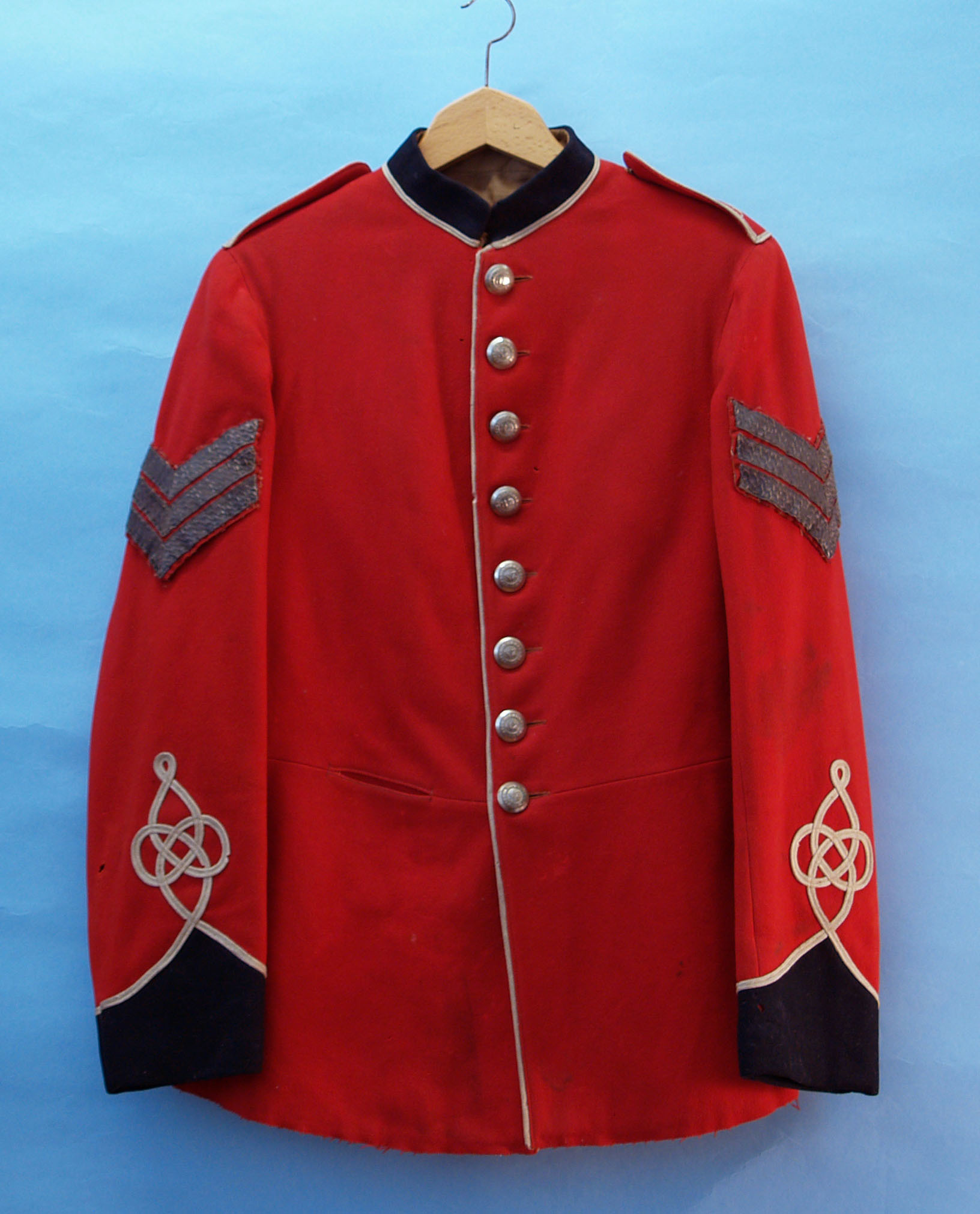
Sergeant. Auckland Rifle Volunteers, circa 1885

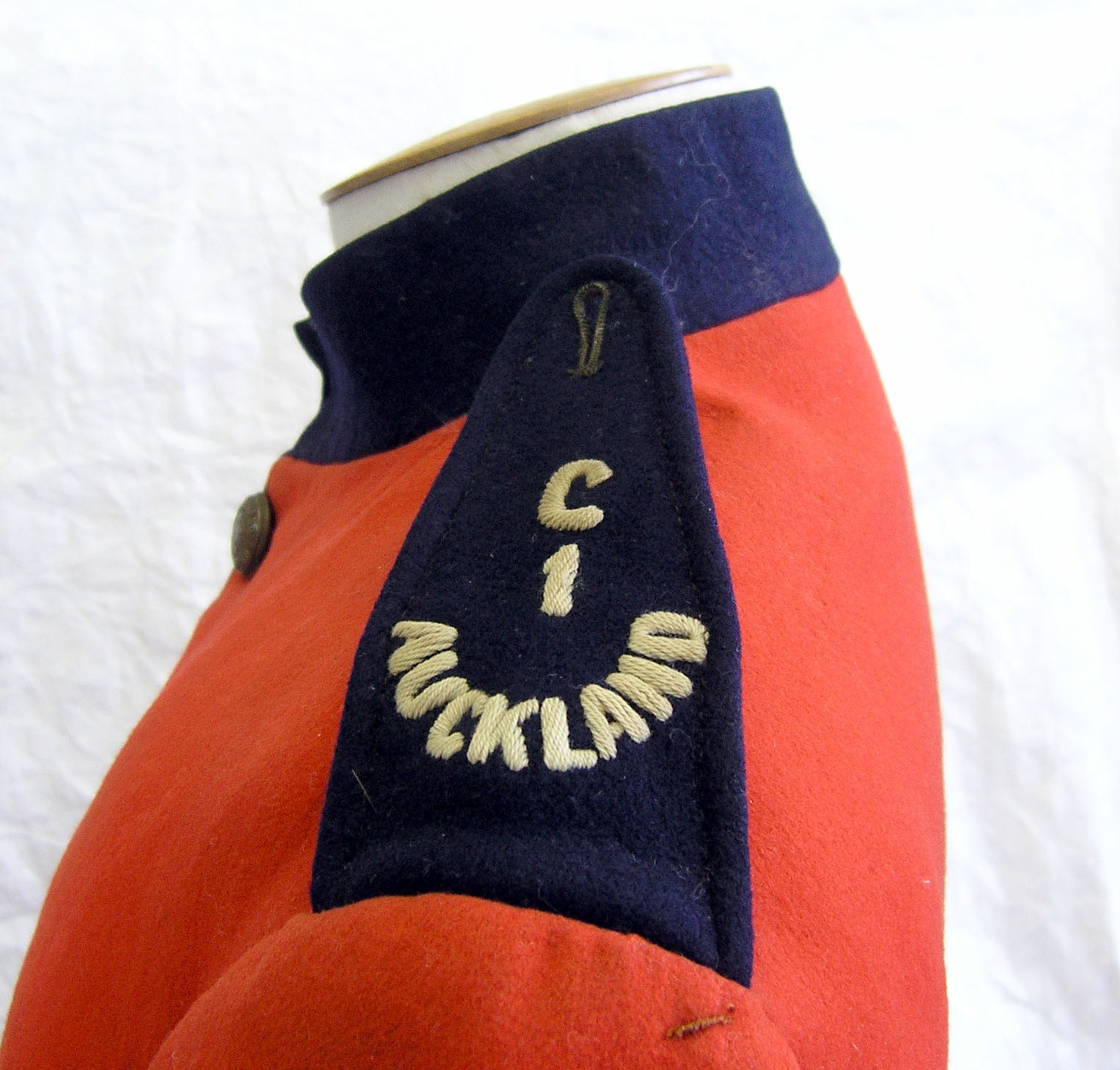
Auckland Territorial Volunteers "C1 Auckland" military jacket, circa 1890-1910

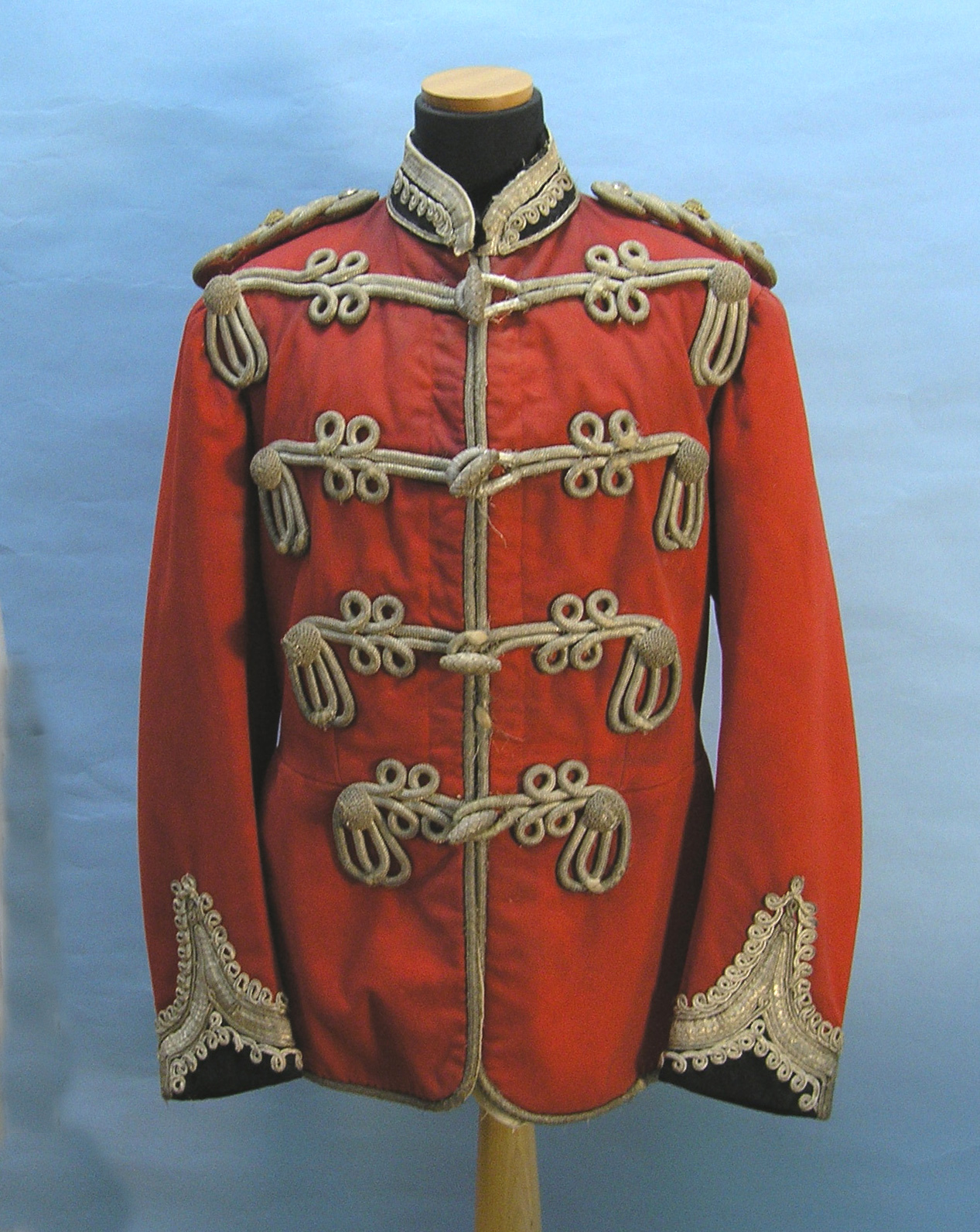
Tunic belonging to Colonel Arthur Morrow, Auckland Military District Staff, New Zealand Defence, circa 1890s

== Boer War uniforms ==
The New Zealand contingent serving in South Africa from 1899 to 1902 sometimes wore the British pith helmet with standard khaki drill uniform and puttees. The usual headdress however was the Australian style slouch hat, worn at this stage in its history without the turned-up brim. The New Zealand and other colonial contingents in this war affected a more casual dress style than the more strictly disciplined British regulars.

== Volunteers and Territorial Army ==
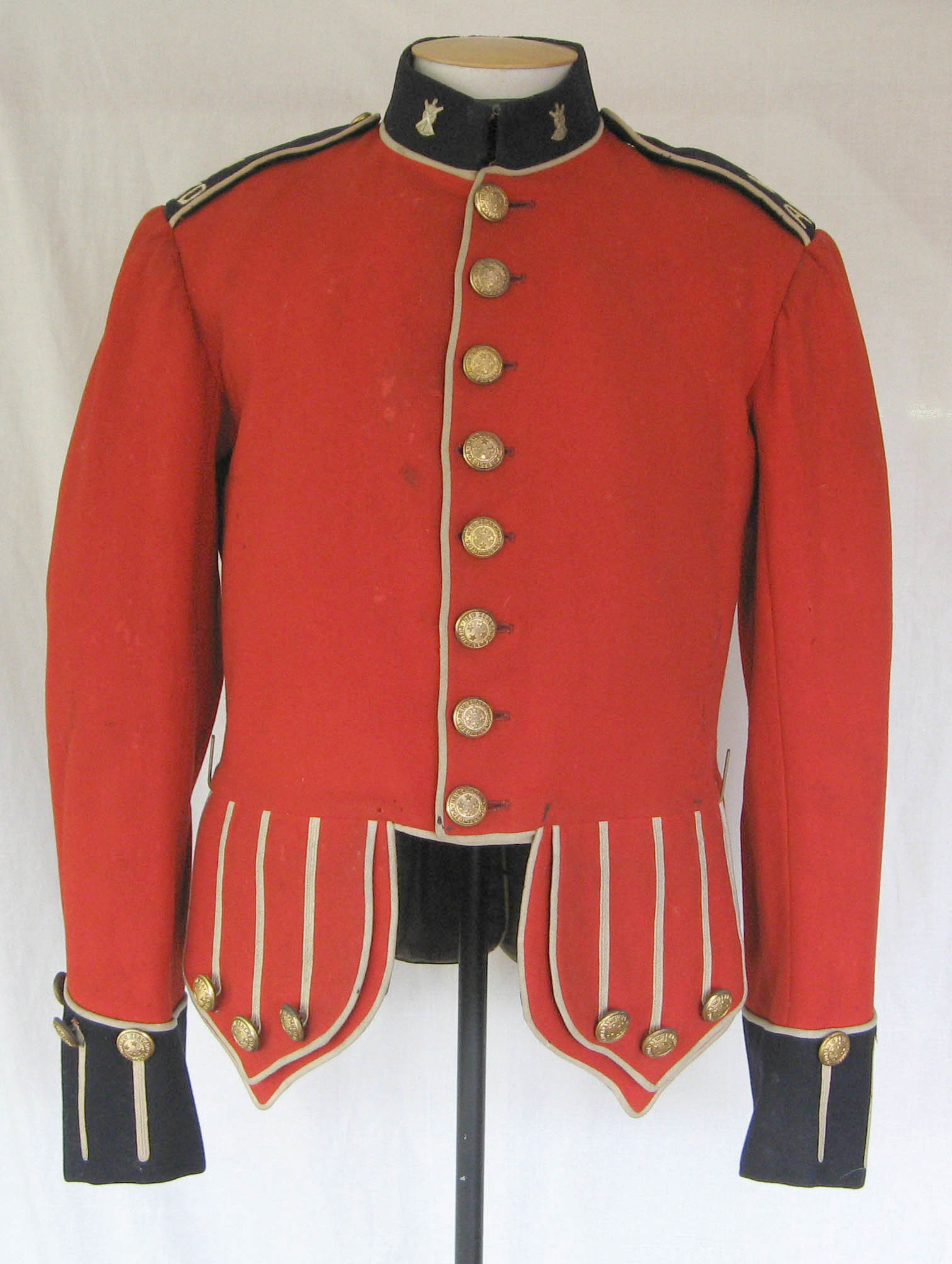
Highland doublet - Auckland Rifle Volunteers, Gordon Highlanders, circa 1900

The Volunteers were created by the Militia Act of 1858, and continued until 1910. The force consisted of infantry, cavalry, and artillery, and was usually formed for specific tasks and duties. The various volunteer militia units in existence until 1910 wore a variety of scarlet, dark blue or rifle-green dress uniforms, generally closely following contemporary British Army patterns.

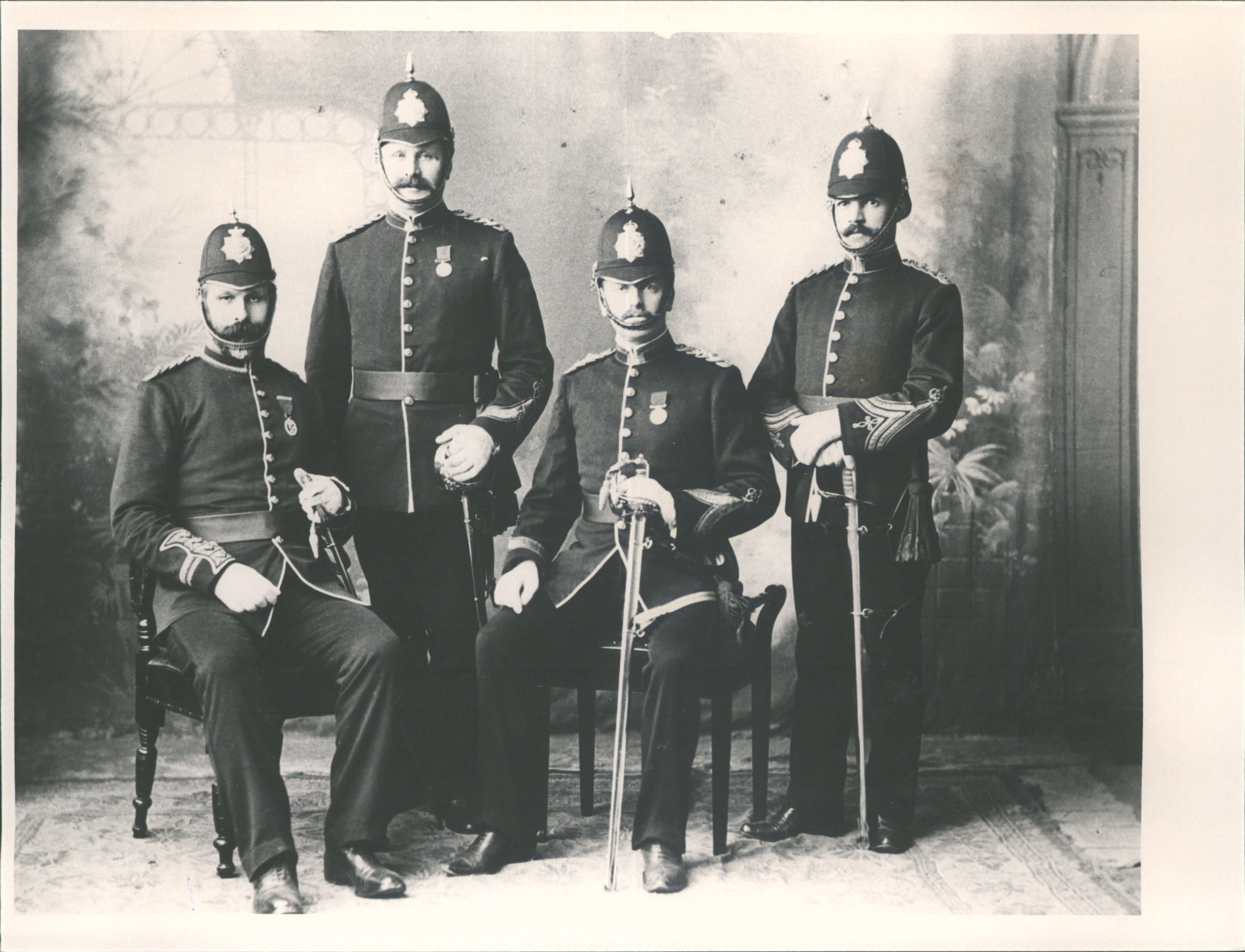
Officers of the Dunedin City Rifles and Dunedin City Guards, ca. 1904-1905

Some units, recruited in coastal areas, favoured Royal Navy style dress. Since 1902 a khaki serge service uniform had also been general issue.

Recruiting for the militia units declined and the Defence Act of 1909 called for the Volunteer Force to be replaced by a Territorial Force manned through compulsory military service.

The regional regiments of the new Territorial Army, which replaced the militia, were issued a new universal uniform in 1912. Modelled on the British 1902 Pattern uniform, the Territorial Force uniform consisted of a greenish/brown single-breasted tunic with four large pockets, elaborate cuffs, and shoulder straps. Coloured piping on the shoulder straps and trouser seams indicated branch of service. The uniform was worn with a slouch hat or peaked forage cap. Units were distinguished by regimental badges attached to the turned up brim of the hat. Dark blue dress uniforms were authorised for officers and members of the small Permanent Staff (regular cadre).

== World War I uniforms ==
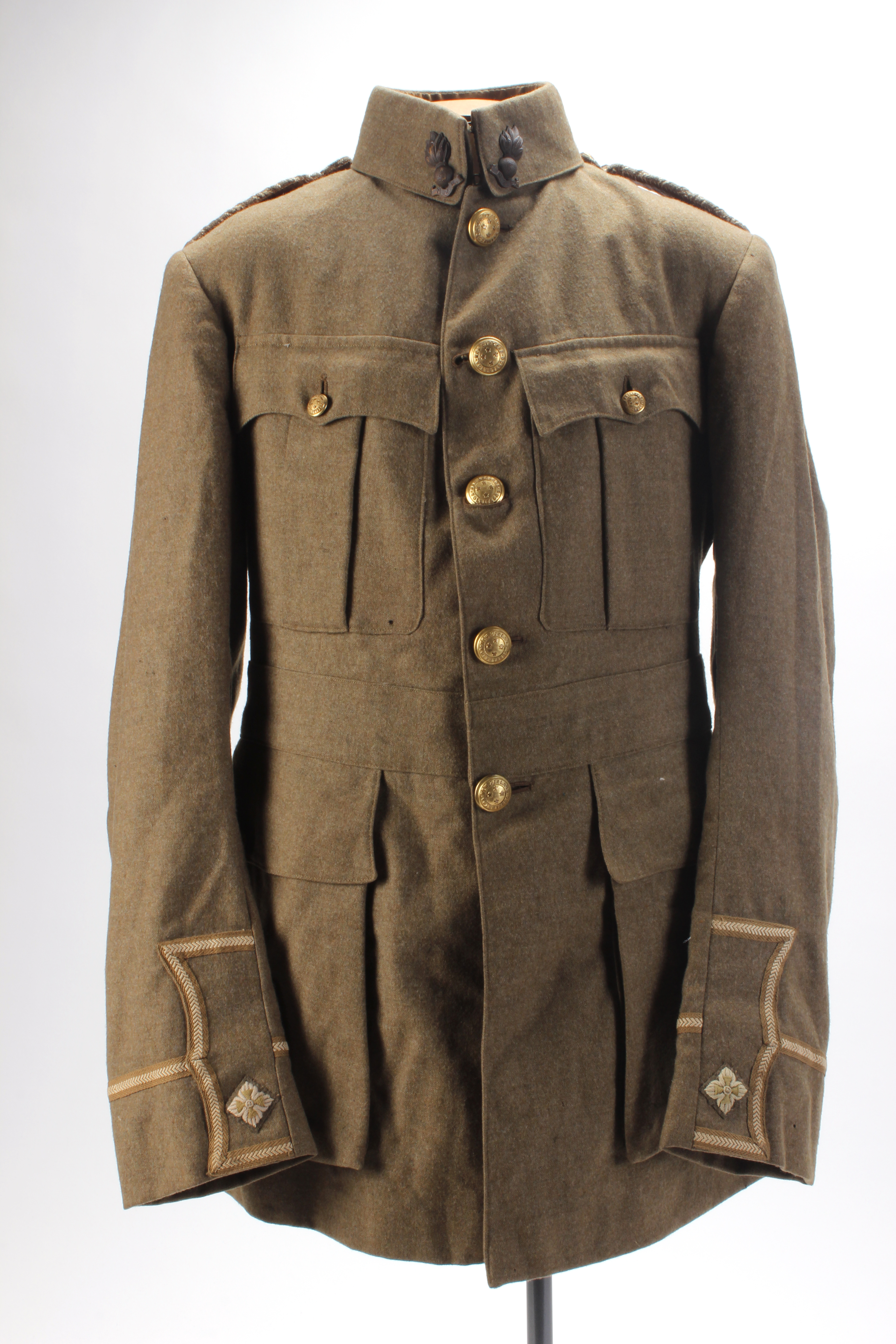
Lieutenant. New Zealand Engineer Volunteers, 1912 Territorial Uniform

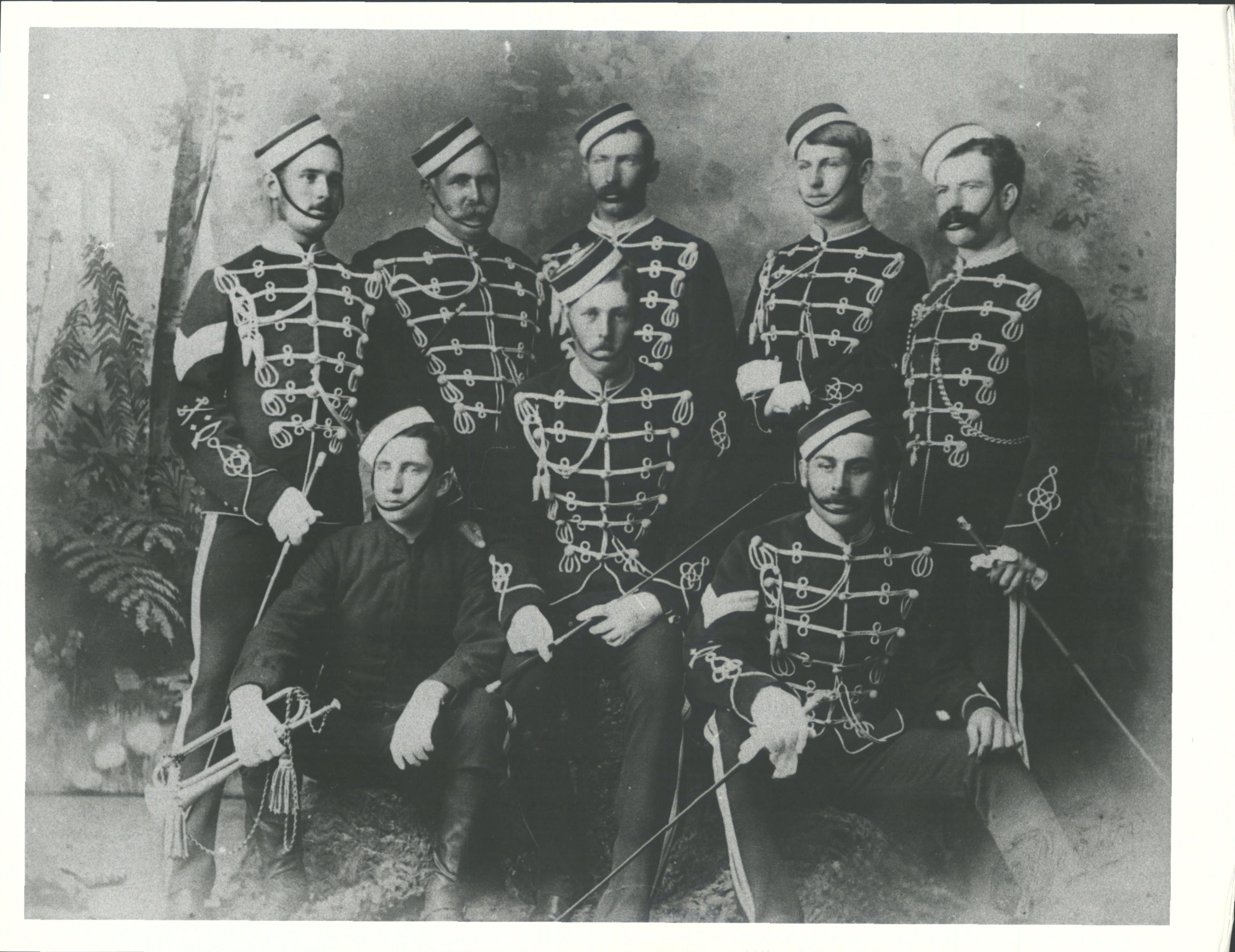
5th Mounted Rifles Otago Hussars, 1911

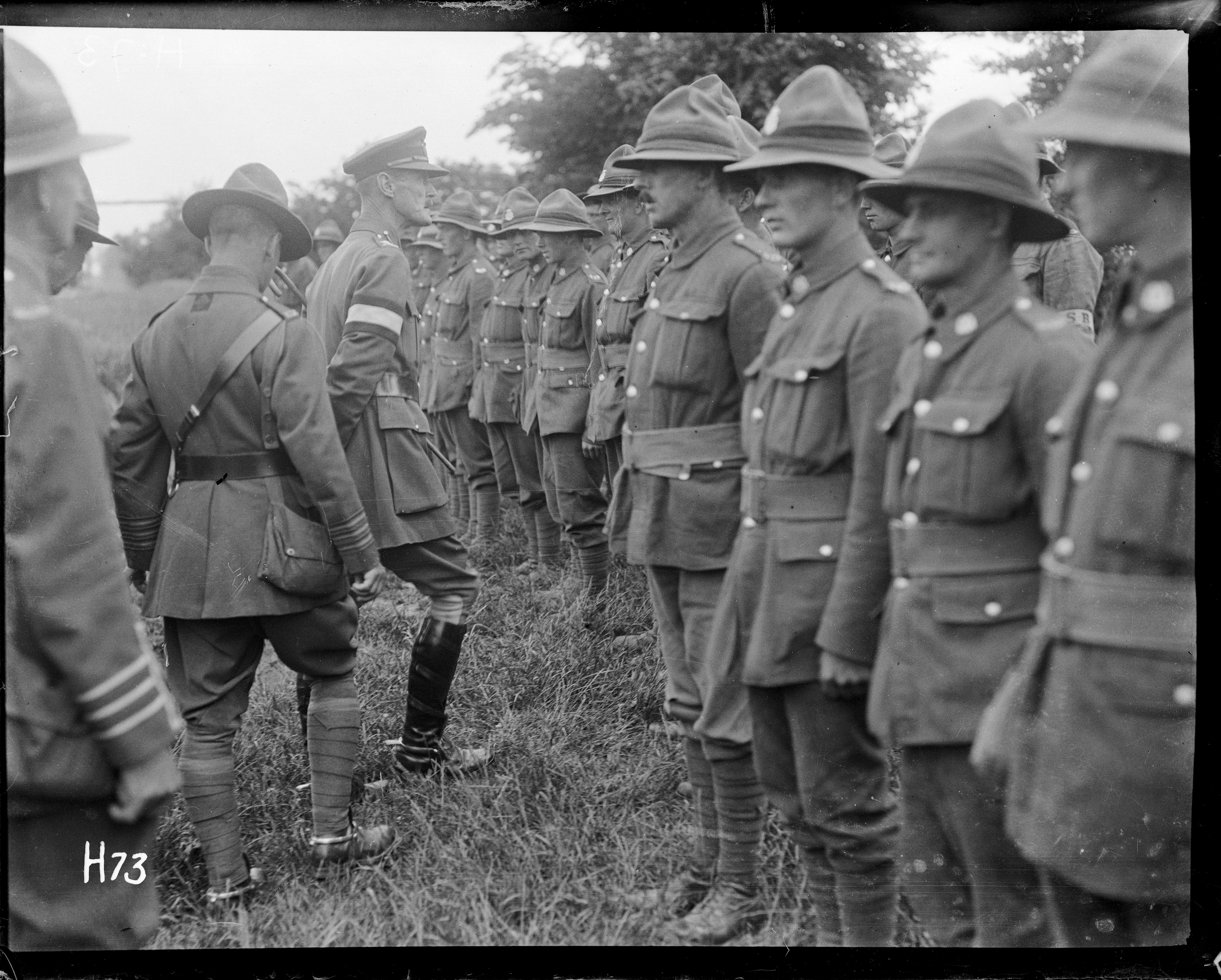
New Zealand troops after the Battle of Messines, 1917

New Zealand's Territorial Force formed the basis of the New Zealand Expeditionary Force (NZEF) sent to help the British in World War I although there was no formal military connection between the Territorials and the NZEF. Most volunteers who joined the NZEF had received military training in the Territorials. They wore the Territorial Force uniform issued in 1912. Trousers were wrapped from ankle to knee in woollen puttees.

Infantry were equipped with a locally modified version of British 1908 pattern webbing, while Engineers were provided with a basic webbing garrison rig. Mounted Rifles Regiments used New Zealand designed and manufactured bandolier equipment, while the New Zealand Field Artillery wore the standard British 1903 Pattern leather bandolier.

The 5th Mounted Rifles (Otago Hussars) was formed on 17 March 1911 and fought as part of the Otago Mounted Rifles Regiment during the Battle of Gallipoli, and in Egypt. They later served in France with the New Zealand Division. They wore dress uniforms in the tradition of European Hussars.

During the Gallipoli campaign New Zealand troops wore a variety of hot-weather khaki drill uniforms with either slouch hats or the forage cap of the standard 1912 uniform. Supply difficulties and the harsh nature of terrain and climate during this campaign meant that little emphasis was placed on smartness or uniformity of dress.

After the Gallipoli campaign the New Zealand Expeditionary Force replaced the "extravagant" Territorial Force uniform with khaki uniforms of British style together with the distinctive campaign hat that would come to be nicknamed the "lemon squeezer" in New Zealand. The different branches of service were distinguished by coloured puggarees or wide bands around the base of the crown: (blue and red for Field Artillery, green for Mounted Rifles, khaki and red for Infantry, blue for Engineers, white for the Army Service Corps, cherry red for the Medical Corps, yellow for the Pay Corps and maroon for the Veterinary Corps).

The uniforms worn on the Western Front included a mounted service pattern greatcoat, the Brodie helmet when in combat, and the universal combat boots and puttees wrapped around the legs. The conspicuous coloured branch facings were phased out after 1916, although surviving on the campaign hats.

== Inter-war period ==
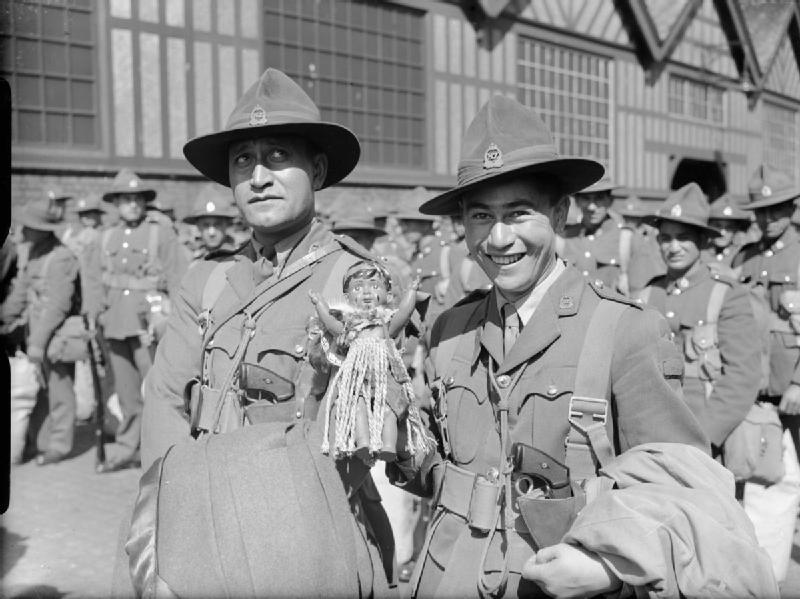
Māori Battalion officers wearing inter-war uniforms, June 1940

The reduced peace-time New Zealand forces of the period 1920–39 retained what was essentially a smartened version of the Western Front uniform of 1916–18. Puttees however were replaced by short anklets during the 1930s and a dark-blue dress uniform was approved in 1938 to encourage voluntary recruiting for Territorial units. Only bands resumed the scarlet parade uniforms of the pre-1910 Volunteer era.

The lemon squeezer with the wide range of coloured puggaree hat-bands to distinguish branches and units was retained in most orders of dress.

Until mechanization, the Mounted Rifles regiments wore their own version of the slouch hat, with a green puggaree.

== World War II uniforms ==
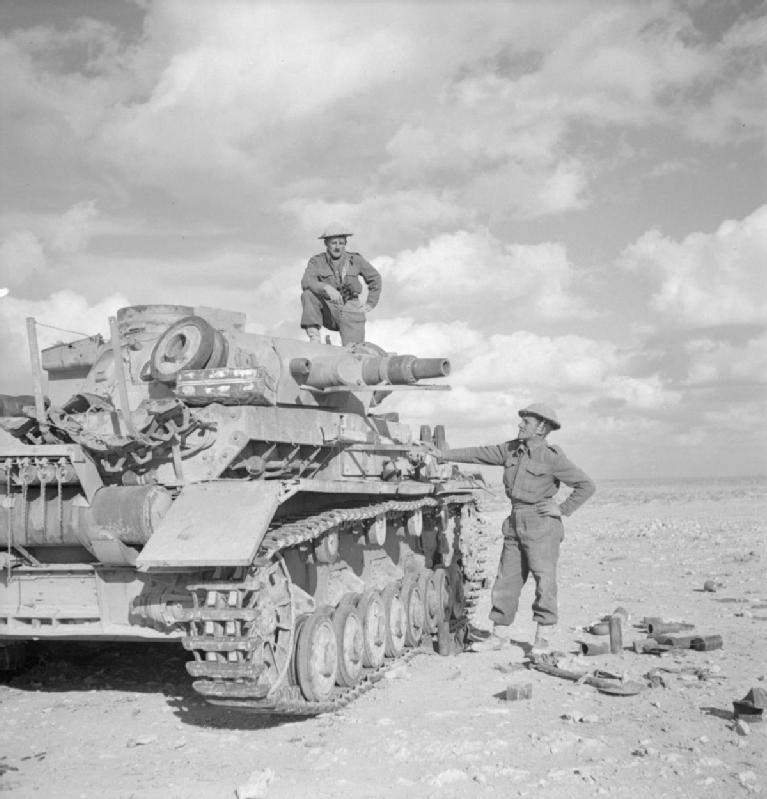
New Zealand troops wearing British battle dress inspect a disabled German tank, Tobruk 1941

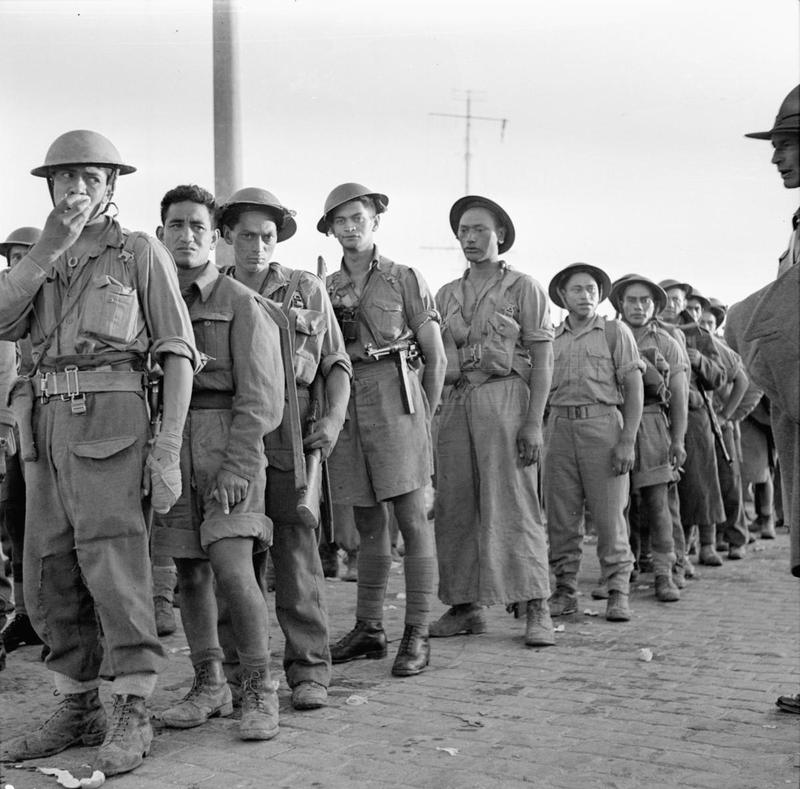
Maori New Zealander troops in Egypt, 1941

During the earlier stages of the War the 2nd New Zealand Expeditionary Force wore the now traditional "lemon squeezer" Campaign hat with the universal "NZ" badge. The hat with its conspicuous coloured puggarees and wide rigid brim was largely replaced by more practical forage caps and berets during the Italian campaign of 1943–44.

A high-collared khaki service uniform, drawn from peace-time issue, was soon replaced by British battle dress in common with other Commonwealth forces (with the exception of Australia which continued to use their World War I uniforms). In late 1939 large scale manufacture of Battle dress uniforms was started in New Zealand by numerous local clothing manufacturers. The New Zealand version was almost identical to British 1937 pattern, made in Serge twill but of a darker brown, while the stitching was a contrasting light colour. The NZ blouse had a six button fly front, rather than the British five.

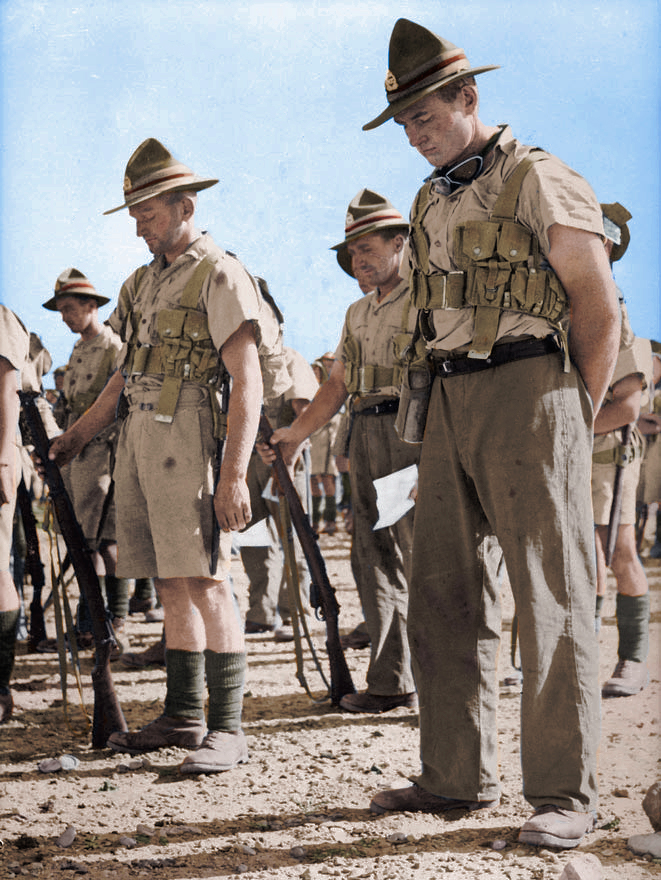
New Zealander soldiers commemorate ANZAC Day in Africa, 1940

In North Africa the New Zealanders wore light khaki Drill cotton short-sleeved shirts and shorts.

During the Pacific Campaign in 1943–1944, members of the 3rd New Zealand Division were issued New Zealand-designed and manufactured light-weight khaki shirts and pants in plain drill material. A second New Zealand-made blouse with four front pockets in a camouflage pattern consisting of dark green, chocolate brown, black, and lime green was issued for combat use.

In combat the Brodie helmet was also worn. The helmet was assembled in New Zealand from Australian materials and could be worn with a hessian cover held with a draw-string. A black diamond was sewn on the helmet cover, usually with the NZ Forces badge with "NZ" and "Onward" mounted on the diamond. Latter-war helmets were also imported complete from Australia.

== Korean War uniforms ==
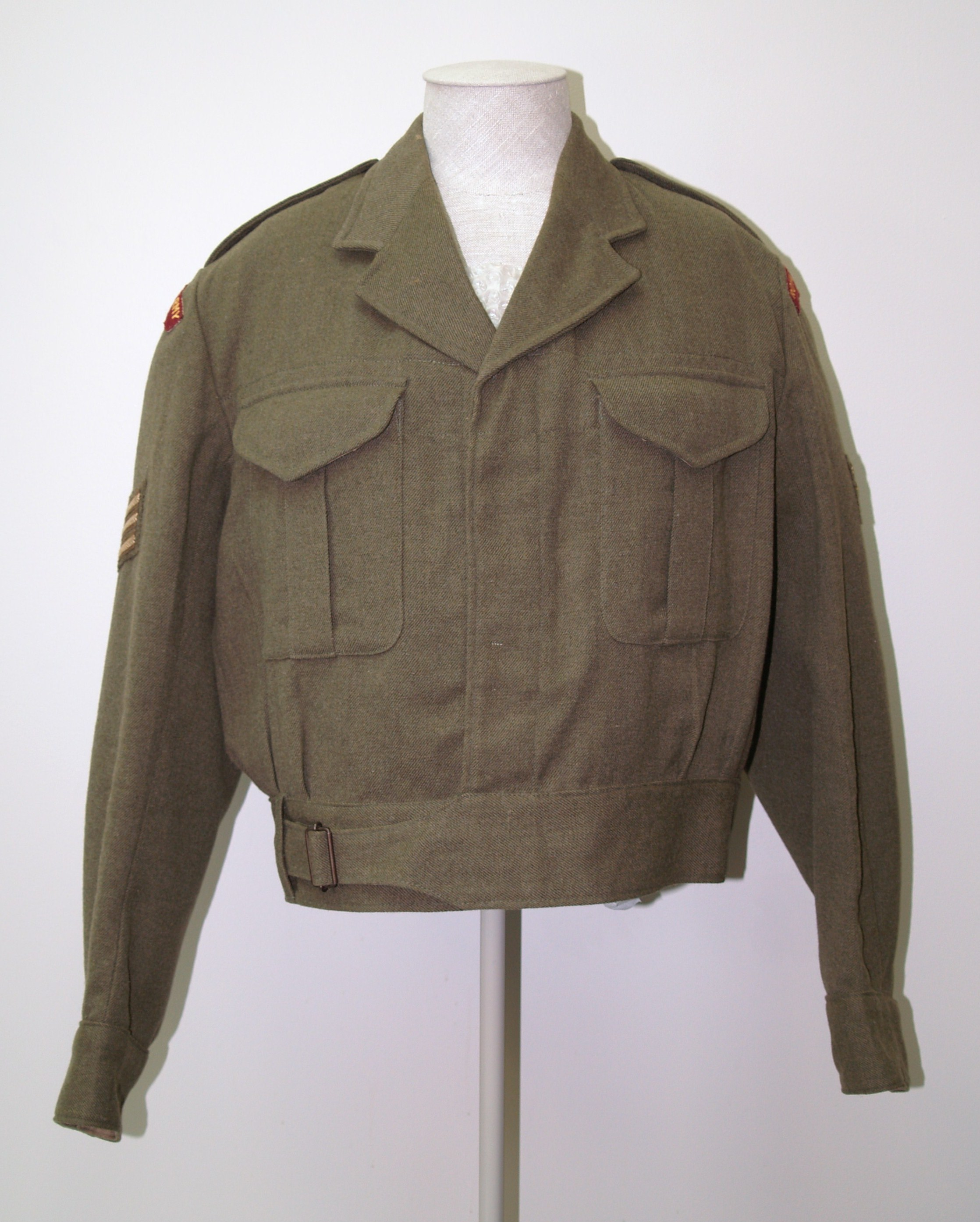
New Zealand battledress, circa late 1950s/early 1960s. Worn in World War II, Korea, Malaya

New Zealand committed an artillery regiment and a company from RNZASC in the Korean War.

New Zealand uniforms were basically the same as other participating Commonwealth forces, as all Commonwealth forces served in the British 1st Commonwealth Division. British, Canadian, New Zealand, and South African forces entered the war wearing World War II-style battle dress with different headdress, such as berets, forage caps, and slouch hats to distinguish each other. Australia never adopted British Battle dress during World War II but did eventually adopt it later in Korea.

The colours of each nation's Battle dress differed. Canadian Battle dress had since World War II been more green than the British, and New Zealand Battle dress was always a darker brown. The Battle dress worn by the South African Air Force serving in Korea was more of a tan colour.

Due to the harsh and freezing conditions of the Korean winter Allied forces had to source suitably protective clothing by any means available. The British issued the "1950 combat dress" which was based on the U.S. Army M1943 uniform Commonwealth troops often had to wear a mix-and-match of British and American cold weather clothing, depending on supply, proximity, and availability.

== Malayan conflict, Borneo ==
British-pattern Battle Dress was worn until the late 1950s, with British-issue "Jungle Greens" being used as field wear with Beret or Khaki Cap and British Boonie hat (usually called a "giggle hat" by Australians and a "J hat" by New Zealanders) during the Malayan Emergency, and Borneo.

== Vietnam War ==
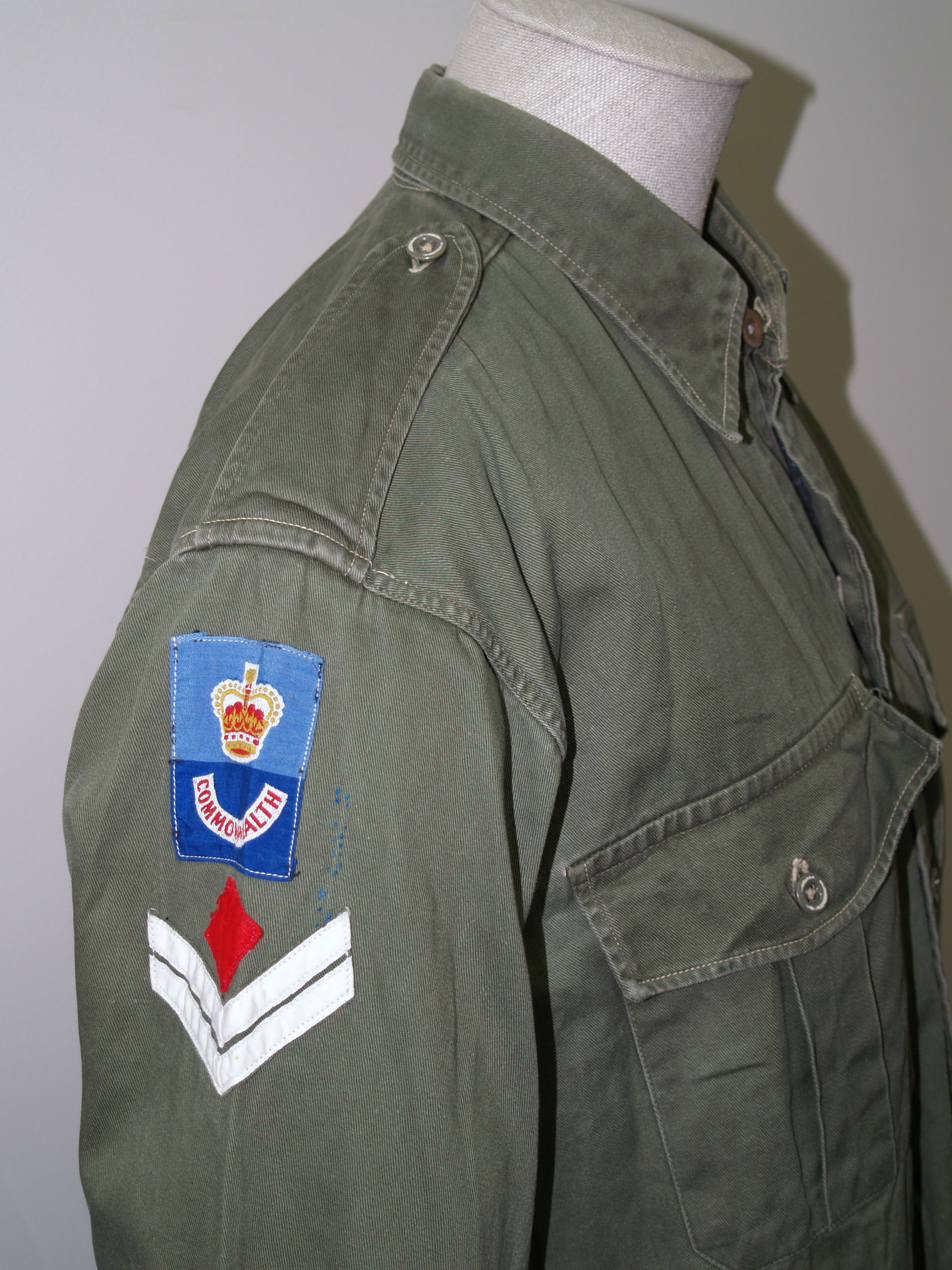
Vietnam-era "JG" shirt belonging to Sgt Colin Whyte, RNZAMC, Vietnam, 1968

In Borneo in 1966, the New Zealand rifle companies wore coloured bands on their jungle hats as a means of recognising and identifying friendly forces in the jungle. The C Company band was black. C Company and D Company formed the basis of the first infantry deployment into Vietnam, Victor Company, with black becoming the colour of the company.

When Victor Company arrived in 1967 the Company members wore a black cravat embroidered with a small white Kiwi bird. At first this was worn as part of the formal dress (although never official) but as the Jungle Greens ("JGs") worn by New Zealanders were almost identical to their Australian counterparts, the cravat was then sometimes worn on operations to distinguish the New Zealanders from the Australians, especially with the first and second Victor companies.

The New Zealand artillery battery serving in Vietnam also used a black cravat with an embroidered white Kiwi bird for both dress uniform and sometimes as field wear.

New Zealand adopted Australian JGs from 1967 and were initially supplied from 1 ATF stocks. Subsequent New Zealand-made JGs were made with one difference in that the shirt pocket flaps were V-shaped and the pockets pleated, otherwise they were identical to the Australian JGs.

In 1968, the Australian military replaced the straight breast pockets of their field shirts with slanted pockets, and the shirt was designed to be worn outside of the trousers in the style of American jungle fatigues. Additional pockets were placed on the upper sleeves of the shirt. The Australian soldiers nicknamed this updated uniform the "pixie suit" (for the slant of the pockets resembling pixie ears.) The new uniform was adopted by both Australian and New Zealand forces but both remained in use, depending on supply. New Zealand-issue "pixie suits" were made in New Zealand. Boots were Australian-issue jungle boots.

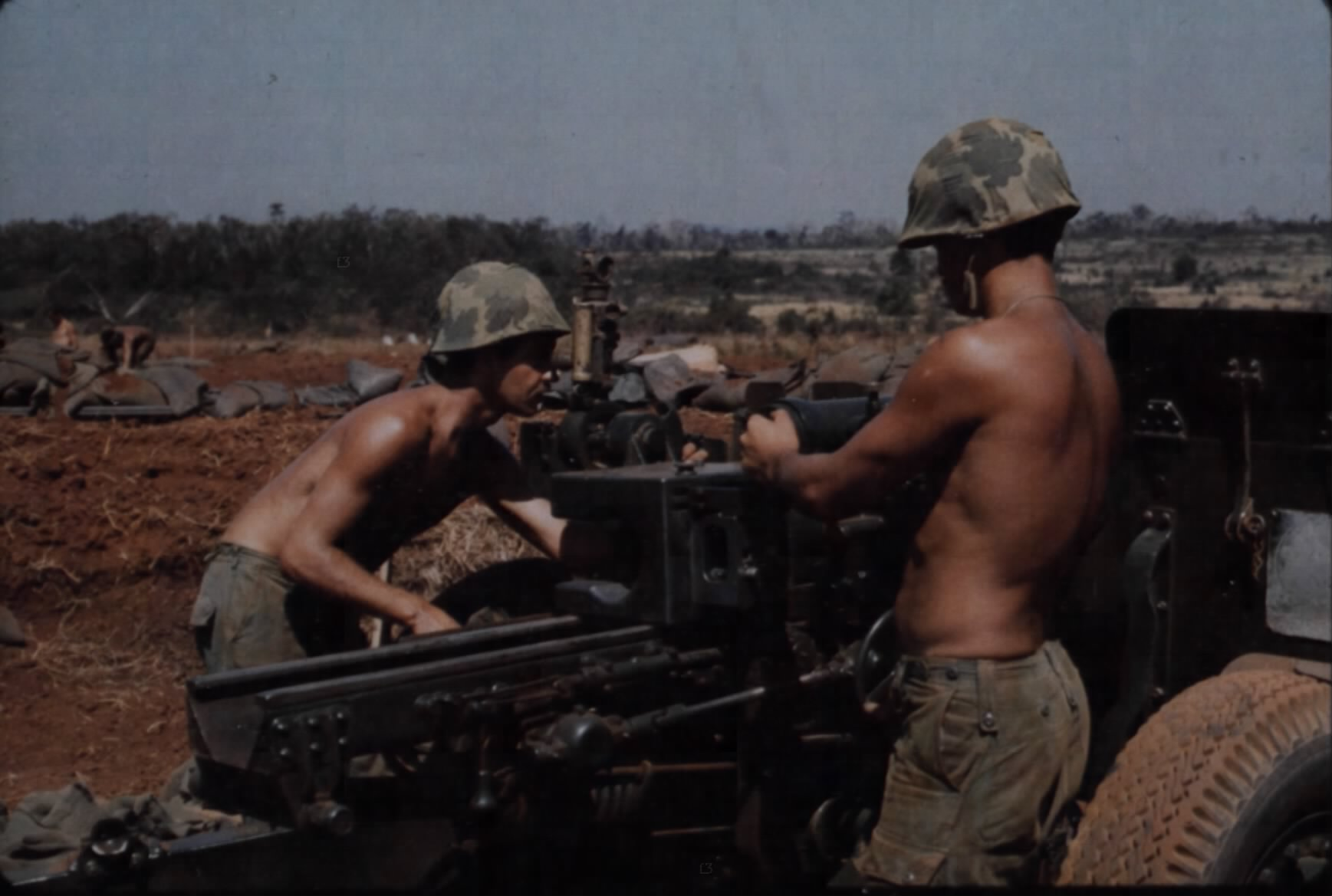
Gunners of 161 Bty RNZA prepare for a fire mission in Vietnam, 1970. The gunners are wearing U.S M1 steel helmets with U.S-issue "Vine Leaf" helmet covers.

For their safety, New Zealand artillery men; and infantry travelling in APCs, trucks, or jeeps were required to wear their issue M1 steel helmet, sometimes with World War II-era netting, and later with U.S-issue "Vine Leaf" helmet covers. The M1 helmet had become standard issue around 1960, replacing the World War II "Brodie" helmet. Flak jackets were also worn.

Although Australians were forbidden by 1 ATF Command, New Zealand soldiers often acquired U.S jungle fatigues and other equipment from the U.S quartermaster, although unofficially. The American uniforms were more suited for carrying maps and other documents and items and were thus popular with RNZIR platoon leaders, mortar crew, and artillery men.

Members of the New Zealand Special Air Service officially wore American jungle fatigues in ERDL camouflage pattern as standard issue during the Vietnam War period and through the 1970s thereafter.

Some local acquisition of South Vietnamese Tigerstripe camouflage pattern uniforms occurred by New Zealanders also but this was very rare and never official.

Australian and New Zealand troops initially wore the British Boonie hats that they used in Malaya and Borneo until 1968, after which local versions were produced. The New Zealand-made "J Hat" was slightly different to the Australian "giggle hat" in that it had press studs so the brim could be folded up.

The two New Zealand Army training teams, 1NZATTV serving in 1971 and 2NZATTV serving in 1972, additionally wore name tags above their right shirt pocket and "NZ ARMY" above their left pockets in the same convention as the U.S Army.

== 1970s - 1990s ==
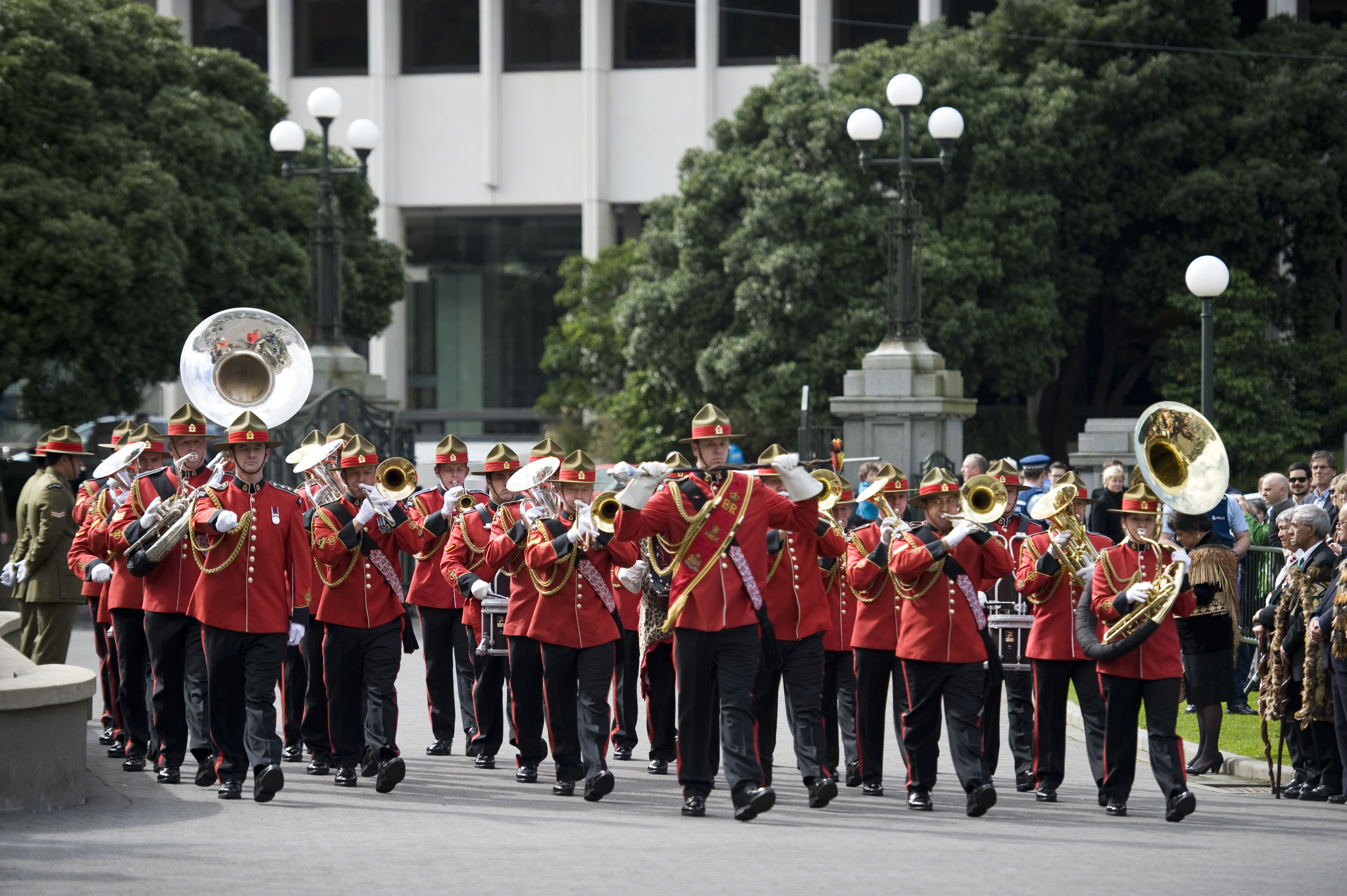
The New Zealand Army Band wearing the unique "lemon squeezer" hat, reintroduced in 1977

Jungle Greens continued to be worn as field wear during the 1970s until British Disruptive Pattern Material (DPM) was adopted in 1980 as the camouflage pattern for clothing.

Having been in abeyance since the 1950s, the distinctive "lemon squeezer" was reintroduced for ceremonial wear in 1977.

The new camouflage uniforms were in the British 1968 Pattern, fully replacing the JGs. The original DPM colours were further modified several times to better suit New Zealand conditions. This evolved pattern is now officially referred to as New Zealand disruptive pattern material (NZDPM.)

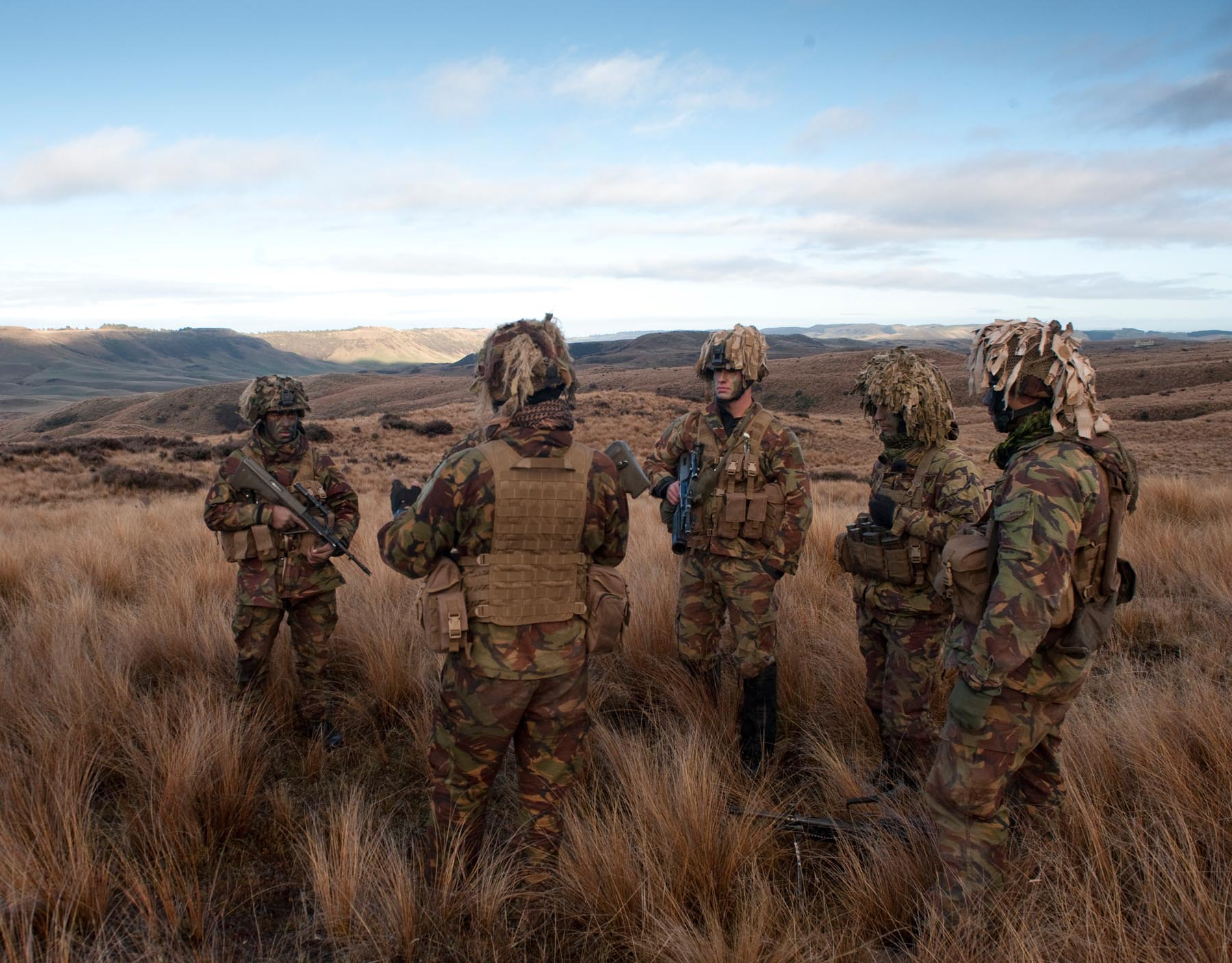
Soldiers wearing NZDPM uniforms, first introduced in 1980

In the mid-1990s a quantity of British windproof smocks were purchased as the indigenously developed DPM camouflage woollen "Swanndri" had never really found favour due to its weight (especially when wet), bulk and impractical cut.

The M1 steel helmet was the standard Combat helmet from 1960 to 2000. With the introduction of DPM camouflage pattern for clothing in 1980, helmet covers in NZDPM pattern soon replaced the helmet covers previously used which were earlier Vietnam War-era reversible USMC Standard ("Vine Leaf") and Mitchell ("brown clouds") and latter U.S ERDL pattern covers.

In 1997 a new uniform was issued which resembled the cut of the British Combat Soldier 95 jungle shirt and trousers. The shirt and trousers featured double knees, elbows and seat. Rank slides were worn on the shoulders. NZDPM remained the camouflage pattern. A lightweight 100% cotton NZDPM windproof smock was issued, which had a rank slide on the front, covered buttons and an integral hood.

A wide brimmed khaki slouch hat with green puggaree, of a pattern formerly worn by the New Zealand Mounted Rifle regiments, replaced the khaki "No 2" British Army peaked cap as Service dress uniform headdress for all branches in 1998.

In the 1990s a universal pattern mess uniform comprising a scarlet mess jacket with blue-black trousers replaced the various regimental and corps mess dress uniforms previously worn, and is now worn by officers and senior NCOs for formal evening occasions. Cummerbunds (waist sashes) are authorised in different unit colours. The universal mess dress also replaced the white jacket and black Barathea trousers previously worn in summer or tropical climates. The mess uniform is based on the British "infantry pattern" mess uniform.

The dark blue "No 1" dress uniform formerly worn by officers before the general adoption of mess uniforms, was last worn in the early 1990s, although it was nominally retained for wear by the chief of army on appropriate state occasions. "Red Patrol" tunics are now authorised for officers of all branches on certain formal occasions. Scarlet and blue full dress uniforms of slightly differing patterns are worn by both the New Zealand Army Band and the Officer Cadet School, together with "lemon squeezer" hats respectively in khaki or dark blue. Bandsmen may also wear white tropical tunics with dark blue/black trousers. Highland orders of dress (glengarry, kilt, and sporrans) are authorised for wear by the New Zealand Scottish Squadron of the RNZAC, at the discretion of the squadron commander. They are also authorised for the pipes and drums of the 5th (Wellington, West Coast and Taranaki) Battalion Group.

== 21st Century uniforms ==
General trends over the past two decades have included the appearance of distinctive New Zealand features in uniform details, combined with the reduction of corps and regimental distinctions in favor of standardised items of dress. The adoption of the Army Combat Uniform (ACU) by the United States in the mid 2000s has had an influence on many world militaries including New Zealand.

In 2000 the M1 steel helmet was replaced by the U.S PASGT helmet. New Zealand-issue PASGT helmets made by UNICOR were identical to the U.S Marine Corps Lightweight Helmet (LWH) in that it too uses a four-point retention strap system (compared to the two-point retention of the PASGT) and the Hook-and-loop-attached pad system otherwise used in the U.S MICH 2000 and ACH helmets, rather than the traditional PASGT suspension system. Helmet covers for the New Zealand PASGT helmet were locally made in NZDPM and NZDDPM patterns by long-time NZDF contractor Hills Hats.

Until 2002, berets were in various colours according to branch or unit. Since then, under a "one beret" policy, rifle-green has become the universal colour for this headdress, except for the tan beret of the New Zealand Special Air Service and the blue beret of the New Zealand Defence Force Military Police.

The dark blue (formerly red) sashes worn by sergeants are now embroidered with a traditional Māori motif or mokowaewae denoting speed and agility. On the infantry sash, the mokowaewae appears in black, white and red diagonal 'steps', and on that of the New Zealand Scottish, in green, black and white. Short Māori cloaks are sometimes worn by senior officers as a mark of distinction on occasions of special ceremony, though they are not part of the regulation uniform.

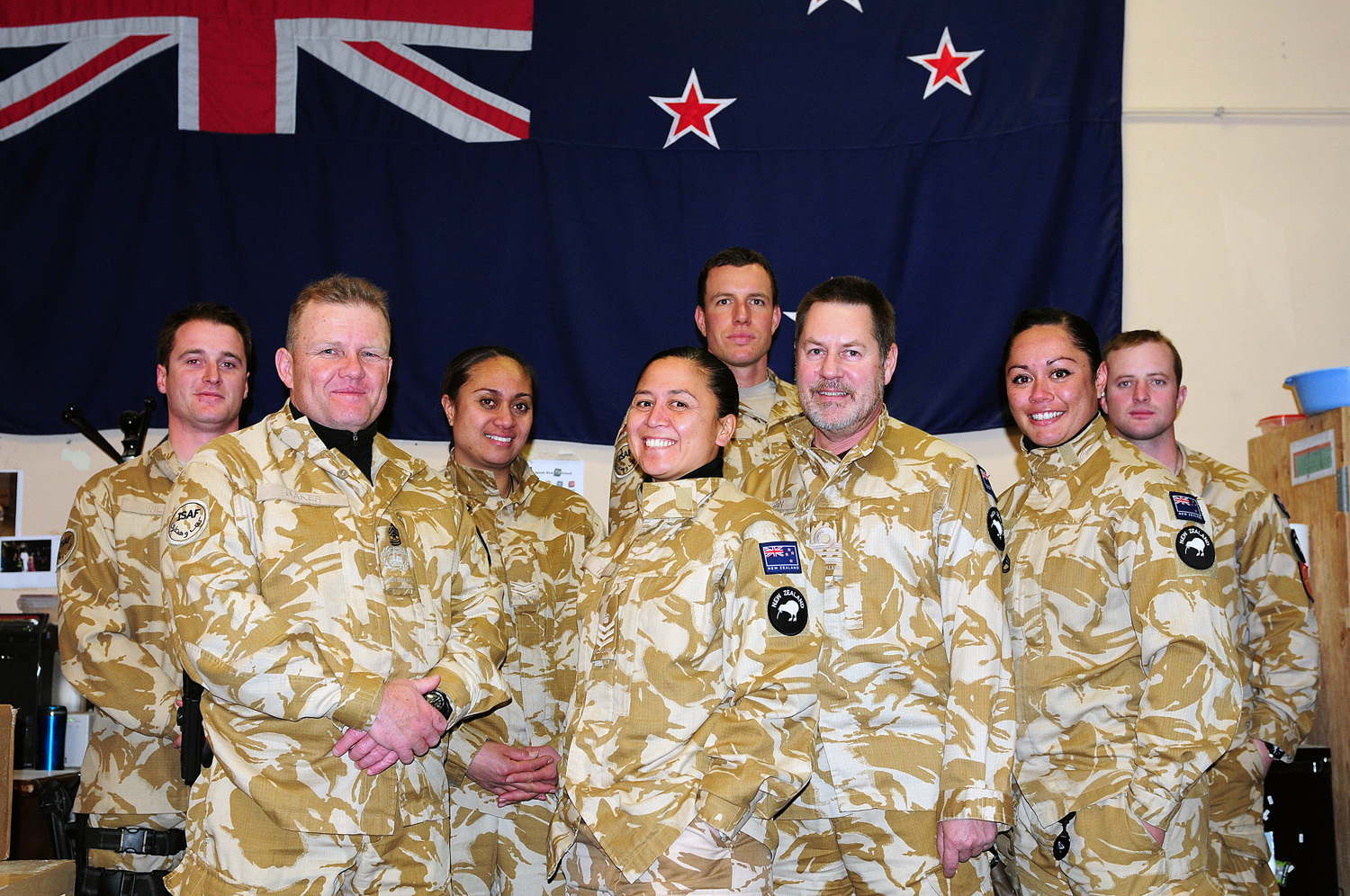
New Zealand Defence Force personnel wearing New Zealand Desert DPM (NZDDPM) uniforms

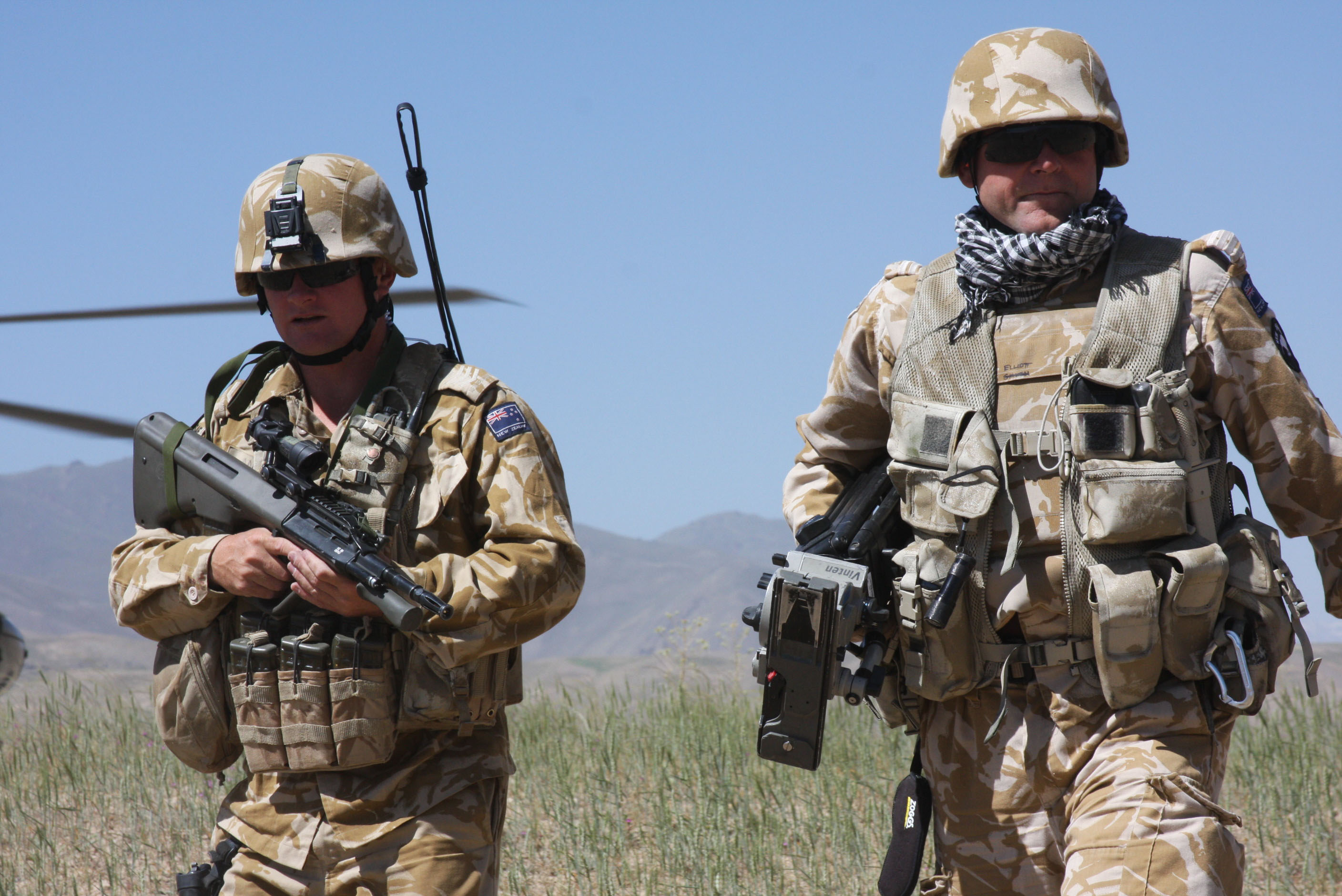
New Zealand soldiers wear NZDDPM camouflage uniforms and PASGT helmets, Afghanistan 2009

In 2003 a desert DPM pattern, based on the British desert DPM pattern, entered use with New Zealand peacekeeping forces in Iraq, Afghanistan and Africa. Visually the NZDDPM pattern has dithering between the brown and sand colours whereas the British pattern has none. NZ SAS soldiers serving in Afghanistan were seen in Australian-issue uniforms in Crye MultiCam camouflage consisting of Under Body Armour Combat System (UBACS) shirt and Crye Gen2 combat pants.

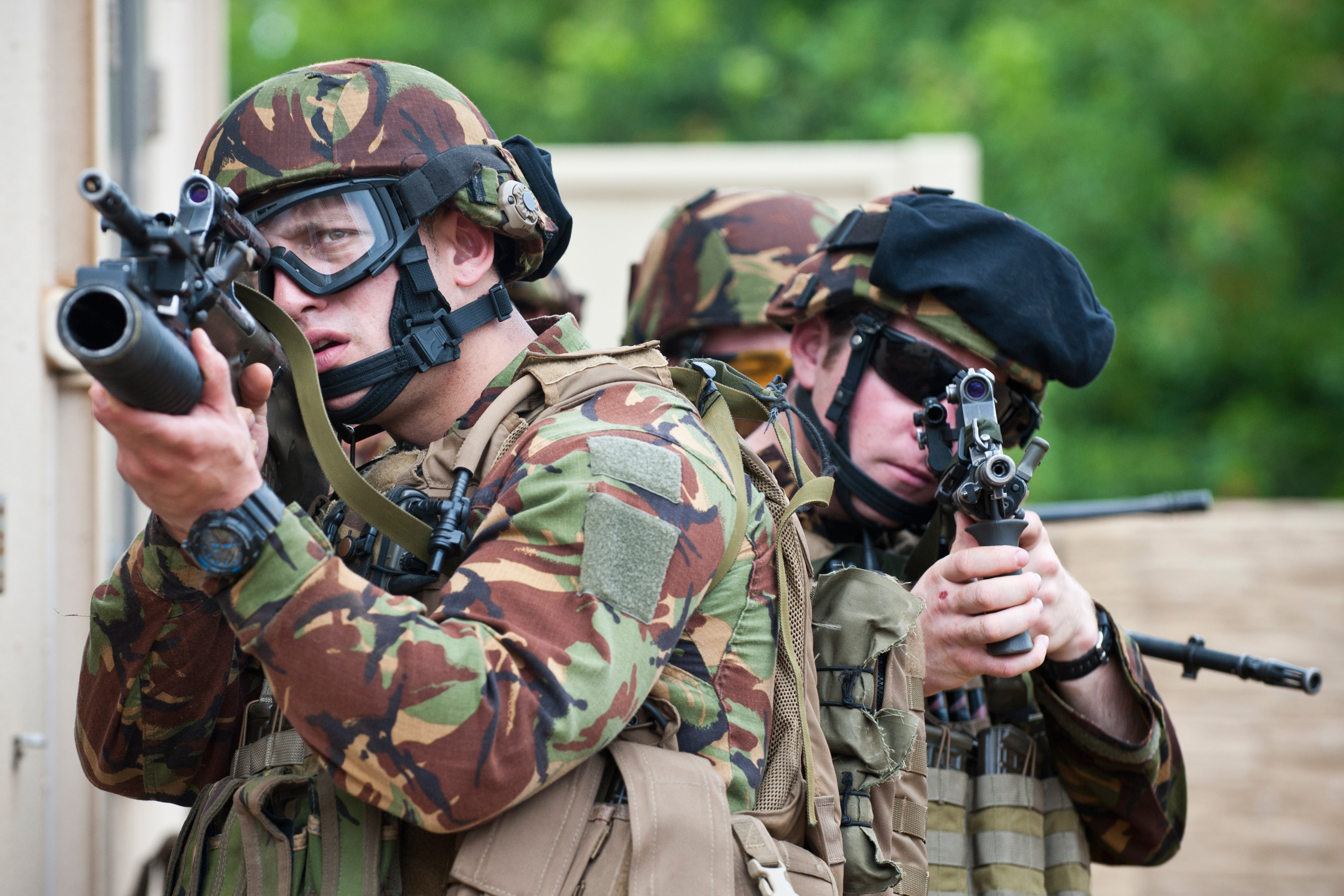
New Zealand soldiers taking part in a military exercise, wearing the 2008-2012 combat uniform

In late 2008, the New Zealand Army commenced issue of a new combat uniform. The cut of the uniform leaned towards the concept and style of the U.S Army Combat Uniform (ACU) and is made in ripstop material. The uniform was produced in NZDPM and NZDDPM patterns. Patch pockets on the shirt were replaced by internal, vertical closure pockets and the shirt was cut for wear outside the trousers. A camouflaged rank slide was worn on the front tab. Velcro patches on the arms enable the wearer to display removable identifying badges, such as the New Zealand flag and the round black and white Kiwi bird emblem, and the United Nations, International Security Assistance Force or Multinational Force and Observers badges as used in overseas deployments and peacekeeping missions. Unlike the ACU which has a Velcro-secured mandarin collar, the New Zealand blouse retained the traditional shirt collar. When worn in the field, the uniform sleeves were rolled down, and camouflage face paint was worn. The NZDDPM version of the 2008 combat uniform was issued for use in Afghanistan, the Sinai and Lebanon. The new uniforms were manufactured by Australian company Workwear Group Pty Ltd.

From 2009 the Israeli-made, Australian Enhanced Combat Helmet (RBH 303 AU) became the standard issue combat helmet although the PASGT helmet is not fully phased out and is still used in training and with reservists.

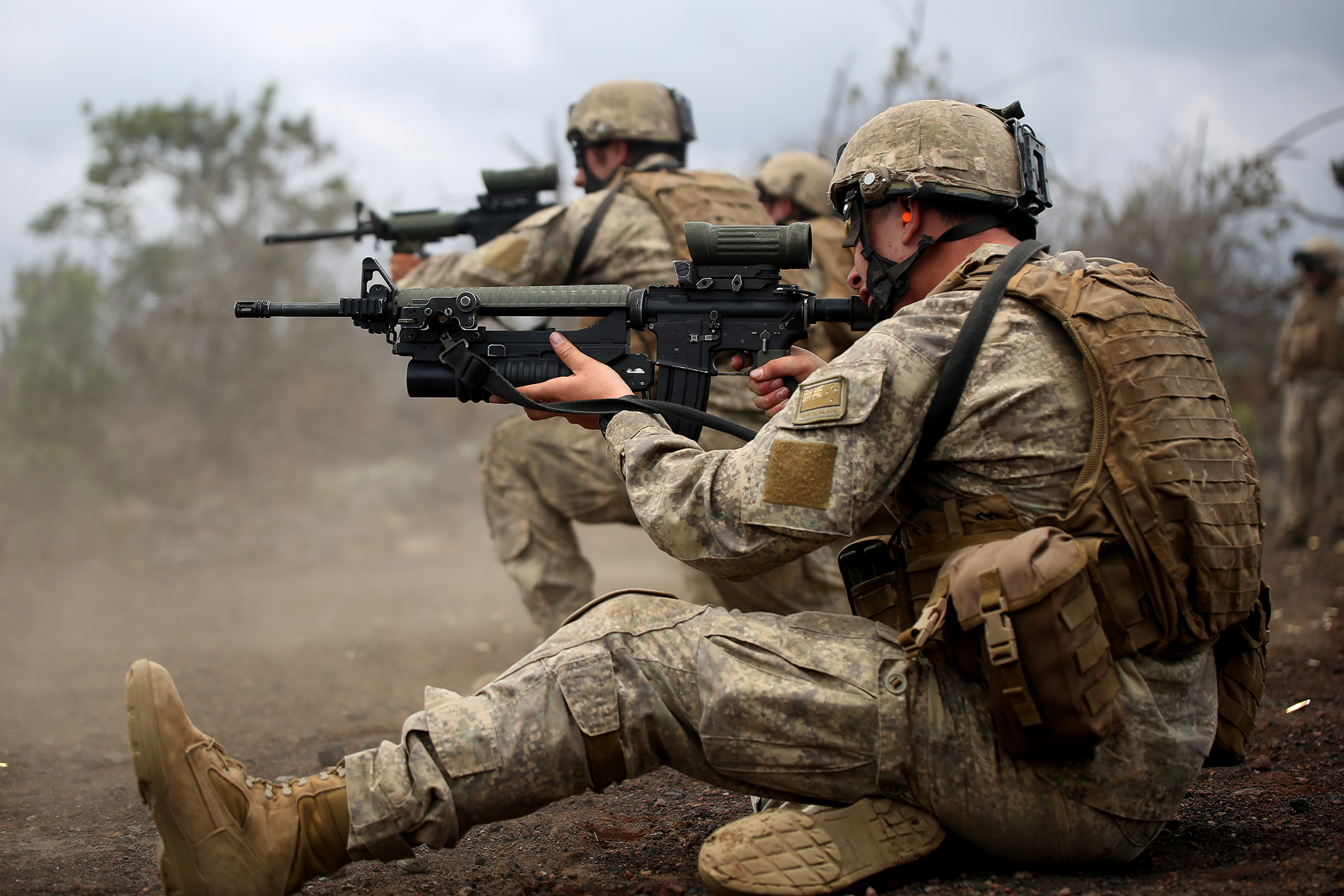
The NZ Army combat uniform, 2013-2019

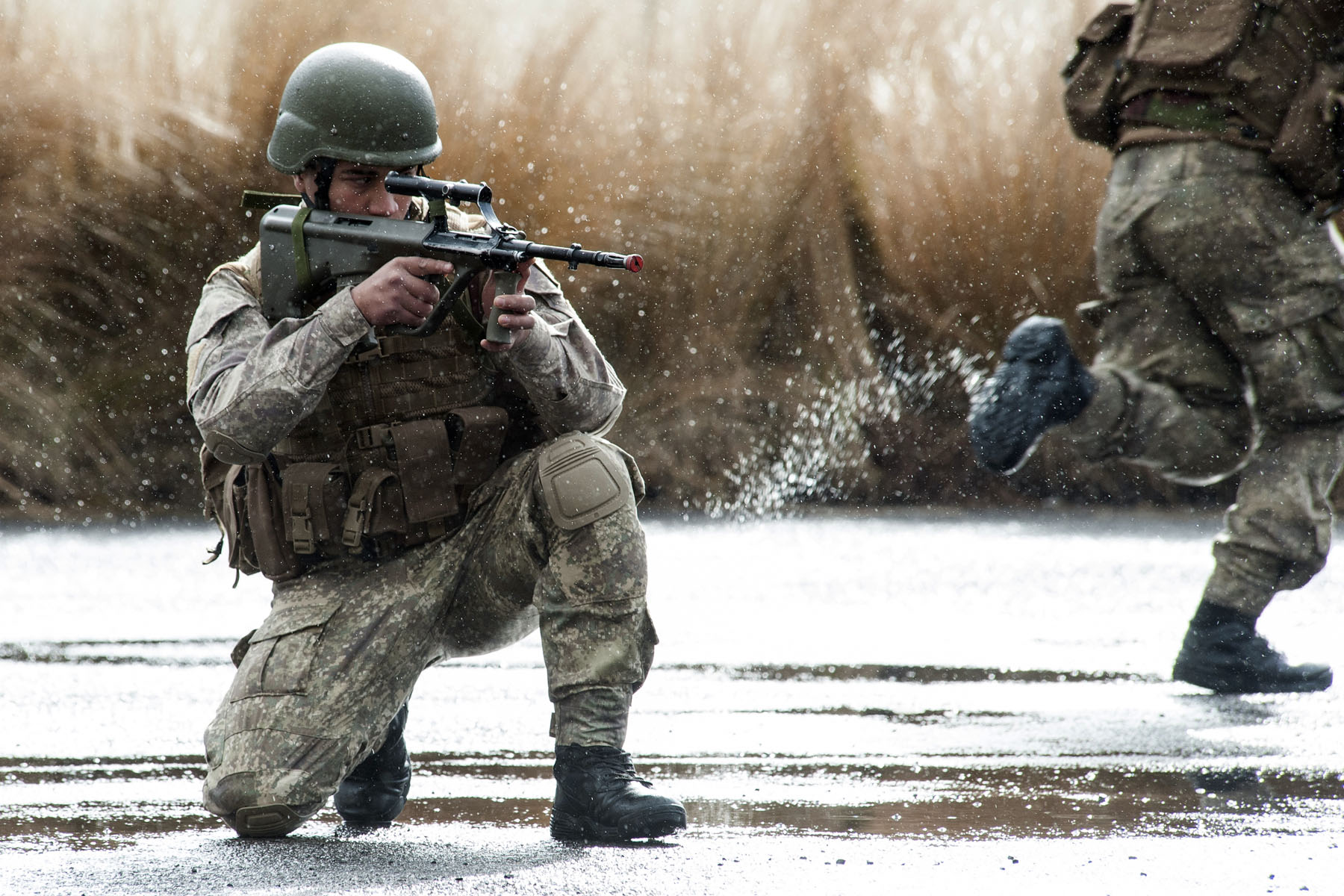
New Zealand soldier wearing the 2013, ACU-style uniform with Crye G3-style pants, and ECH combat helmet.

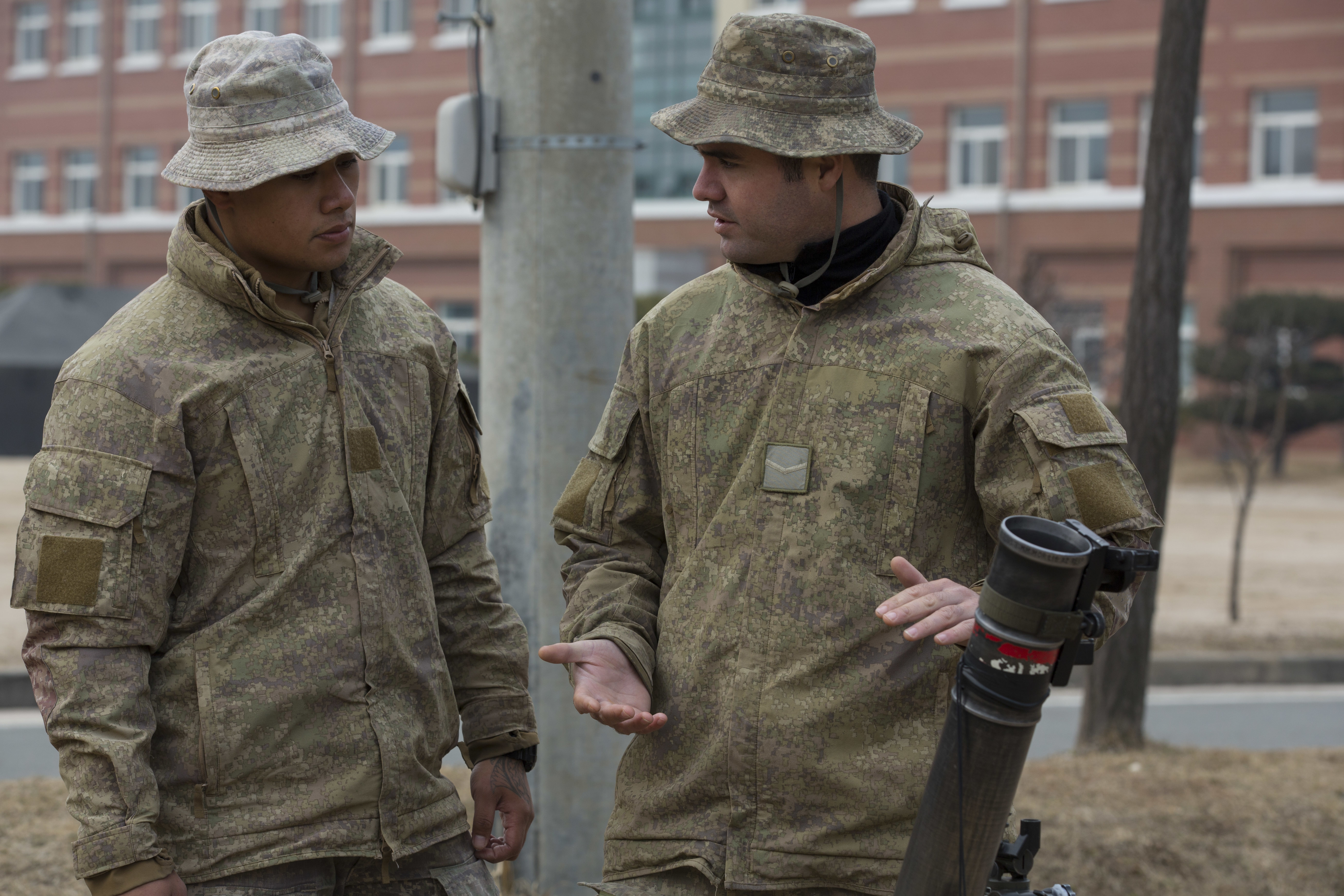
New Zealand gunners from 161 Bty wearing cold-weather gear in New Zealand Multi Terrain Camouflage Uniform (MCU) pattern, 2016

In 2012 it was announced that the Mounted Rifles Hat (MRH) was to become the standard Army ceremonial headdress with the "lemon squeezer" being retained mainly for colour parties, honour guards and other limited categories.

NZDPM and NZDDPM camouflage patterns were replaced in 2013 by a single camouflage pattern and a new uniform called the New Zealand Multi Terrain Camouflage Uniform (MCU) for all branches of NZDF. The camouflage pattern is a variant of the Ghostex family of camouflage patterns by Canadian company Hyperstealth Biotechnology Corp. The cut of the MCU is in the ACU style, with mandarin collar, Velcro closures, slanted arm pockets, and removable elbow pads. However, the MCU pants are not in the ACU style but are instead in the style of the Crye G3 combat pant with additional forward-facing thigh pockets, removable knee pads, and Velcro-adjustable cuff flaps for ease of blousing, the style of which is otherwise usually associated with contemporary Special Forces and Police tactical unit assault uniforms. The MCU, with the addition of a beret or sometimes the MRH, became the working uniform.

After several years of use, modifications to the uniform followed with a change in material to Teredo (polyester/cotton twill) for both uniform and boonie hat, a return to covered buttons, and the removal of the elbow and knee pad pockets.

== Current uniforms ==
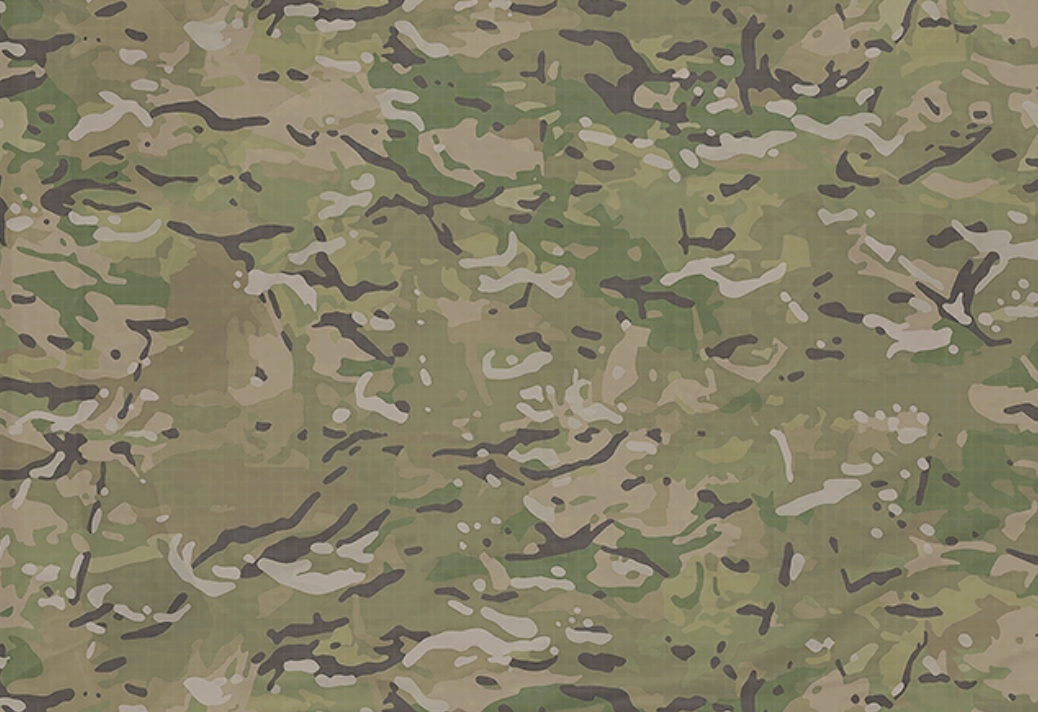
NZMTP camouflage adopted by the NZDF in 2019

In June 2019, the New Zealand Defence Force announced that New Zealand multi-terrain pattern (NZMTP), a variant of the UK Armed Forces’ Multi-Terrain Pattern (MTP) camouflage, itself a variant of Crye Precision's Multicam, would replace the current issue MCU camouflage pattern and the uniform will revert to the 2008 cut with Crye G3 style UBACS also being issued to most units. These changes were applied to the whole of the NZDF and the changeover was fully completed in 2023. Reasons for the change include material sourcing challenges, poor uniform fitting for female service personnel, subpar performance of the camouflage pattern itself, as well as material pattern commonality with Crye Precision's Multicam pattern that is used by over 40 countries, allowing exploitation of current off-the-shelf military clothing and equipment for faster entry to service. The new uniforms continued to be manufactured by Workwear Group Pty Ltd.

In 2022 ADA New Zealand, a subsidiary of Australian Defence Apparel Pty Ltd (ADA), won a 10 year contract to supply the NZDF with uniforms, clothing, boots and load carriage equipment, taking over the contract from previous provider Workwear Group, which had been the NZDF supplier since 2008. Located in Palmerston North, ADA NZ now provides all uniforms for NZDF personnel, using local suppliers for raw materials, manufacturing, and finishing. Suppliers will keep stock as well as fulfilling large orders for the ADA NZ warehouse.

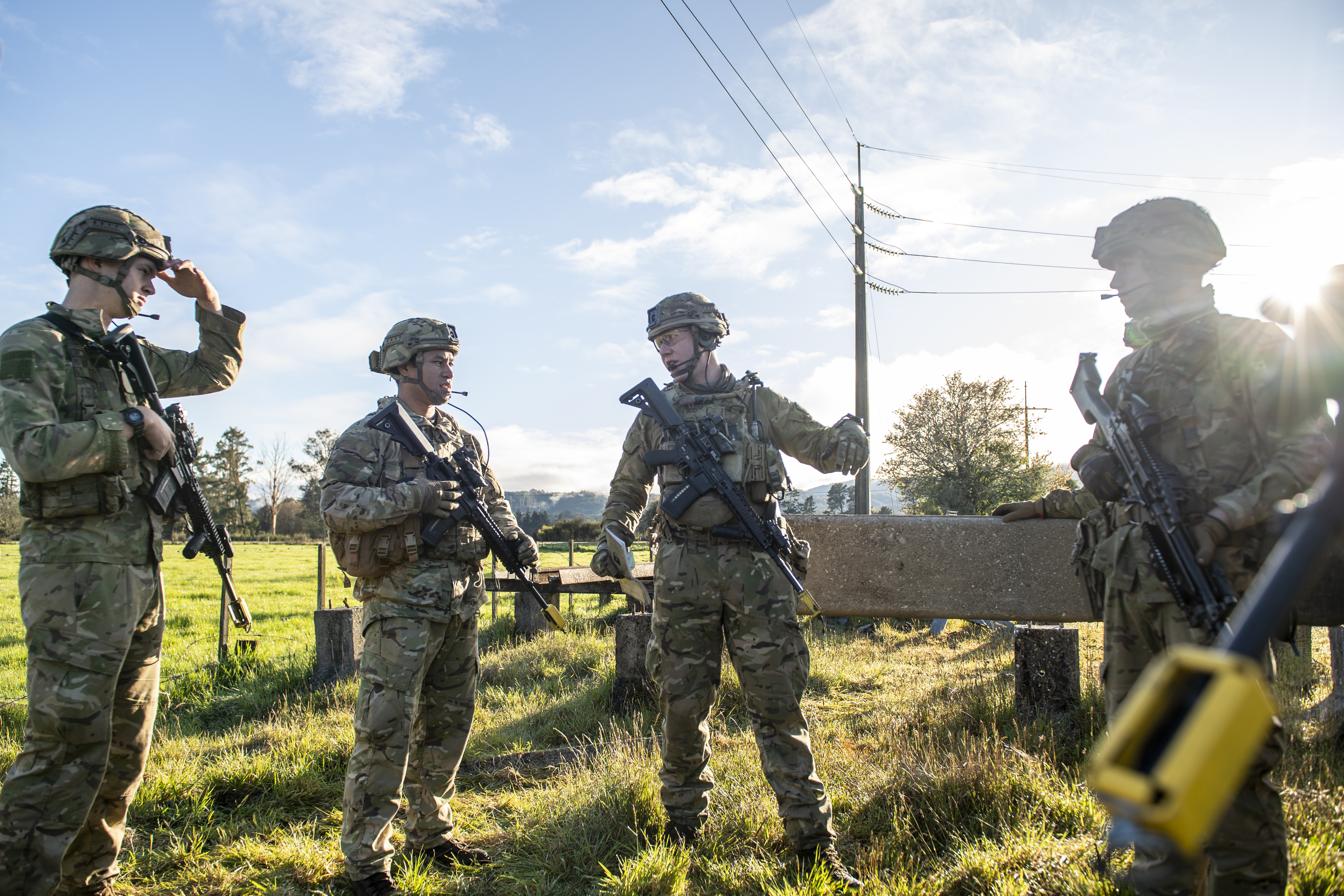
NZ Army soldiers during Exercise Black Bayonet wearing NZMTP uniforms

From late 2019 the Army began replacing the ECH with the Viper P4 ACH by Canadian company Galvion (formerly Revision Military). In April 2024 the Army announced the Soldier Personal Protection Project (SPPE) which introduces the OPS-CORE Hi cut ballistic helmet to replace the Viper P4 in low – medium ballistic threat/non blast operating environments. It also replaces the Tyr EPIC Body Armour with the TBAS Plate carrier for low – medium ballistic threat/non blast operating environments. The SPPE does not replace the current in service Tyr EPIC Body Armour and full cut P4 Viper helmet which provides level 4 protection and is retained for higher threat (including blast) environments. NZSAS continue to wear SOF-specific headgear such as FAST and other helmets.

== Gallery ==
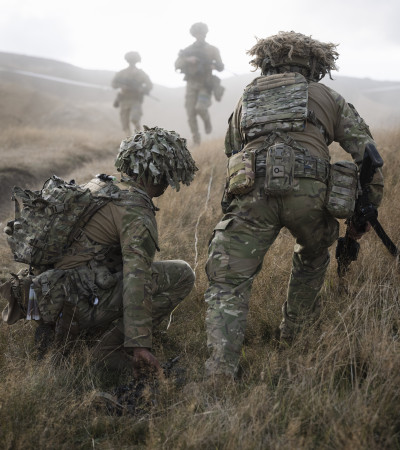
NZ Army soldiers during Exercise Sangro 2025

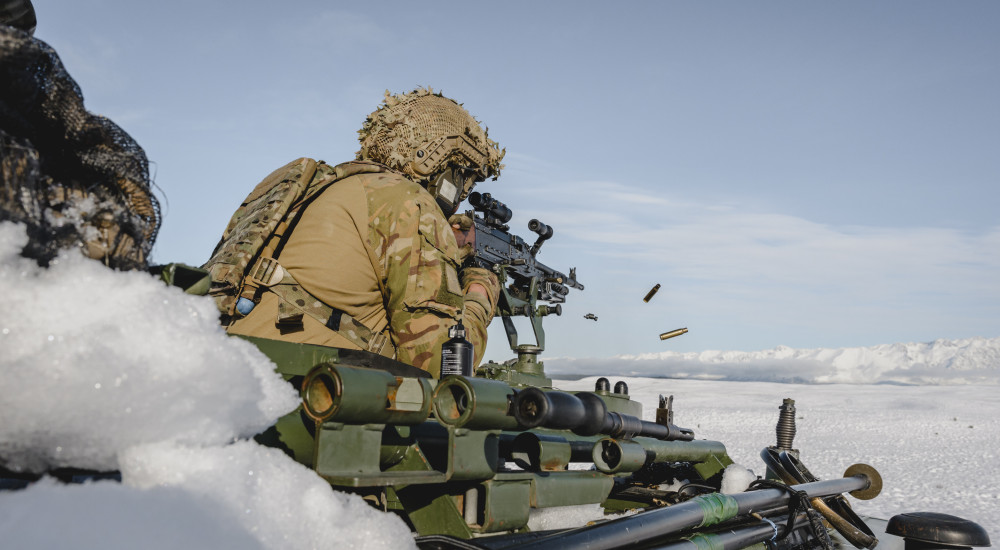
Members of the 2/1 RNZIR Fire Support Group training while wearing the new OPS-CORE helmets

== See also ==
- Royal New Zealand Air Force § Ranks and uniform
- Royal New Zealand Navy#Uniforms
- Combat uniform § New Zealand
- List of military clothing camouflage patterns
- Uniforms of the British Army
- Uniforms of the Australian Army
