= New Zealand disruptive pattern material =

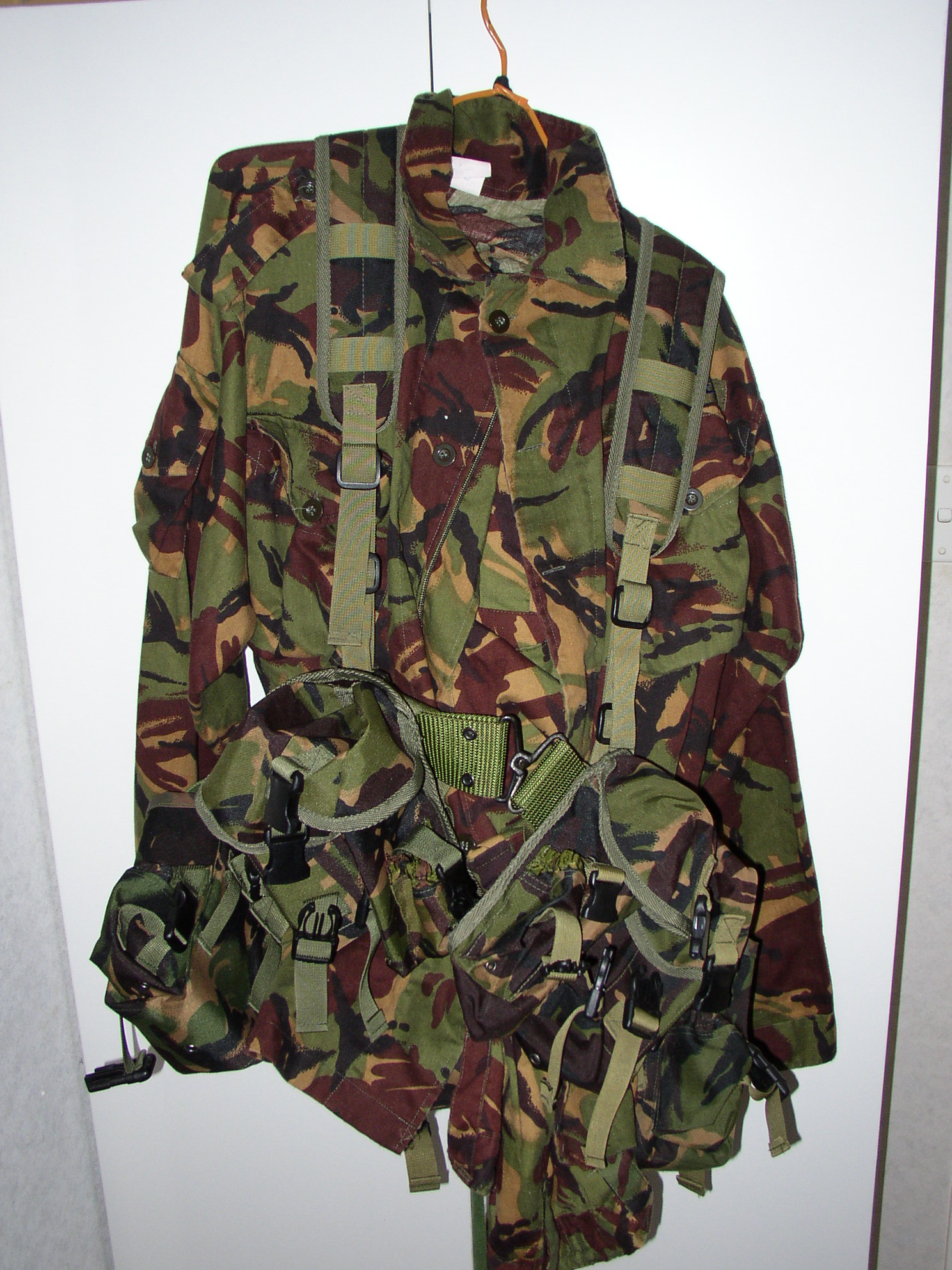
NZ DPM with Webbing

The New Zealand disruptive pattern material, also known as New Zealand DPM (NZDPM), was the official camouflage pattern on uniforms of the New Zealand Defence Force from 1975 until 2013. It was replaced with a new pattern called Multi Terrain Camouflage (MCU) which was exclusive to the NZDF. This was in turn replaced by the New Zealand multi-terrain pattern (NZMTP) from 2020.

New Zealand DPM is derived from British DPM and saw several colour changes before becoming standardized in the 1990s. Dress in this camouflage pattern was worn by all ranks of the New Zealand Army and NZDF for most forms of training and on operations.

== Origins ==
Historically, New Zealand's armed forces used originally British and then Australian-style uniforms, with British battle dress in use until the 1950s and then "jungle greens" as field wear until 1980.

British Disruptive pattern material (DPM) was adopted as the camouflage pattern for clothing of the New Zealand armed forces with the first issues of 1968 Pattern smock and trousers being made in 1977. The material of the uniforms was changed in 1984 to a winterweight fabric. The heavier fabric plus the dying process changed the original DPM colours, making the green more of a sea green and the tan more of a golden colour. This colourway is considered to be the "first generation" of New Zealand-specific DPM camouflage.

In 1986 a lighter weight fabric was used, the combination of the fabric and dying process changing the colours further, with the green becoming a distinctive "mint" colour and the tan colour becoming even more "yellow." The brown used in the 1986 itineration was a more reddish-brown than previously and would wash out over time to an almost "beetroot" colour.

=== 1997 NZDPM Pattern ===
From 1994 to 1995 a new variation of colours of the DPM pattern was used, consisting of black, chocolate brown, and olive green shapes on a tan background. The uniforms had problems with colourfastness and so the New Zealand Defence Force issued a brand new uniform in 1997 which resembled the cut of the British "Combat Soldier 95" jungle DPM shirt and trousers. The colours of the 1997 pattern were different again consisting of black, dark brown, and golden-yellow shapes, on a grass green base. These colours remained consistent thereafter. The 1997 uniform was used as field wear until the late 2000s.

=== 2003 New Zealand Desert DPM (NZDDPM) ===
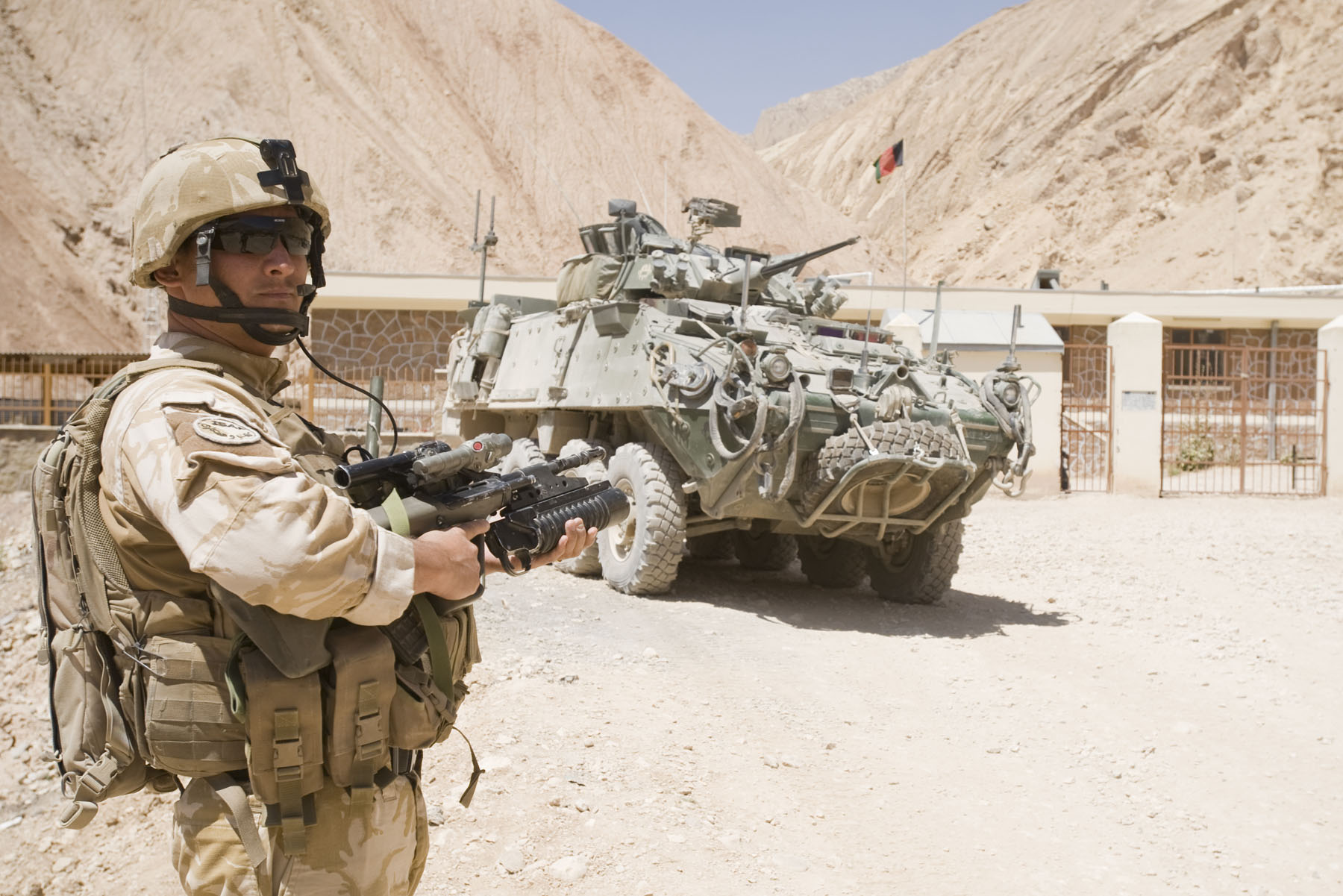
New Zealand soldier in Afghanistan in 2011, wearing the NZ variant of British Desert DPM

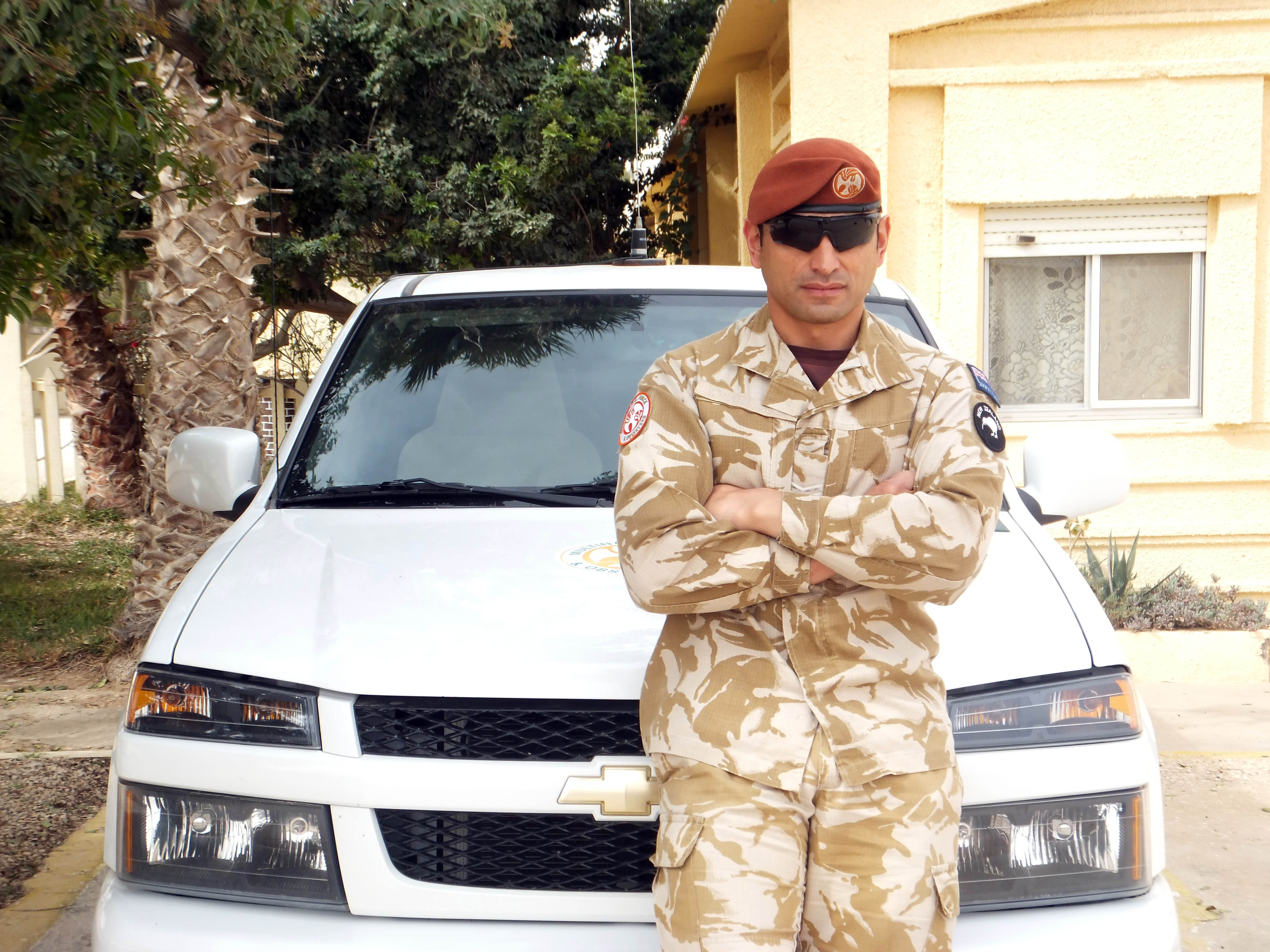
NZDDPM shirt and trousers.

The first NZDF contingents deployed to Afghanistan wore 1997 pattern NZDPM. A desert version of NZDPM first appeared in 2003 with the deployment to Iraq. The pattern is based on British two-colour desert DPM. Visually the NZDDPM pattern has dithering between the brown and sand colours whereas the British pattern has none.

=== 2008 Uniform update ===
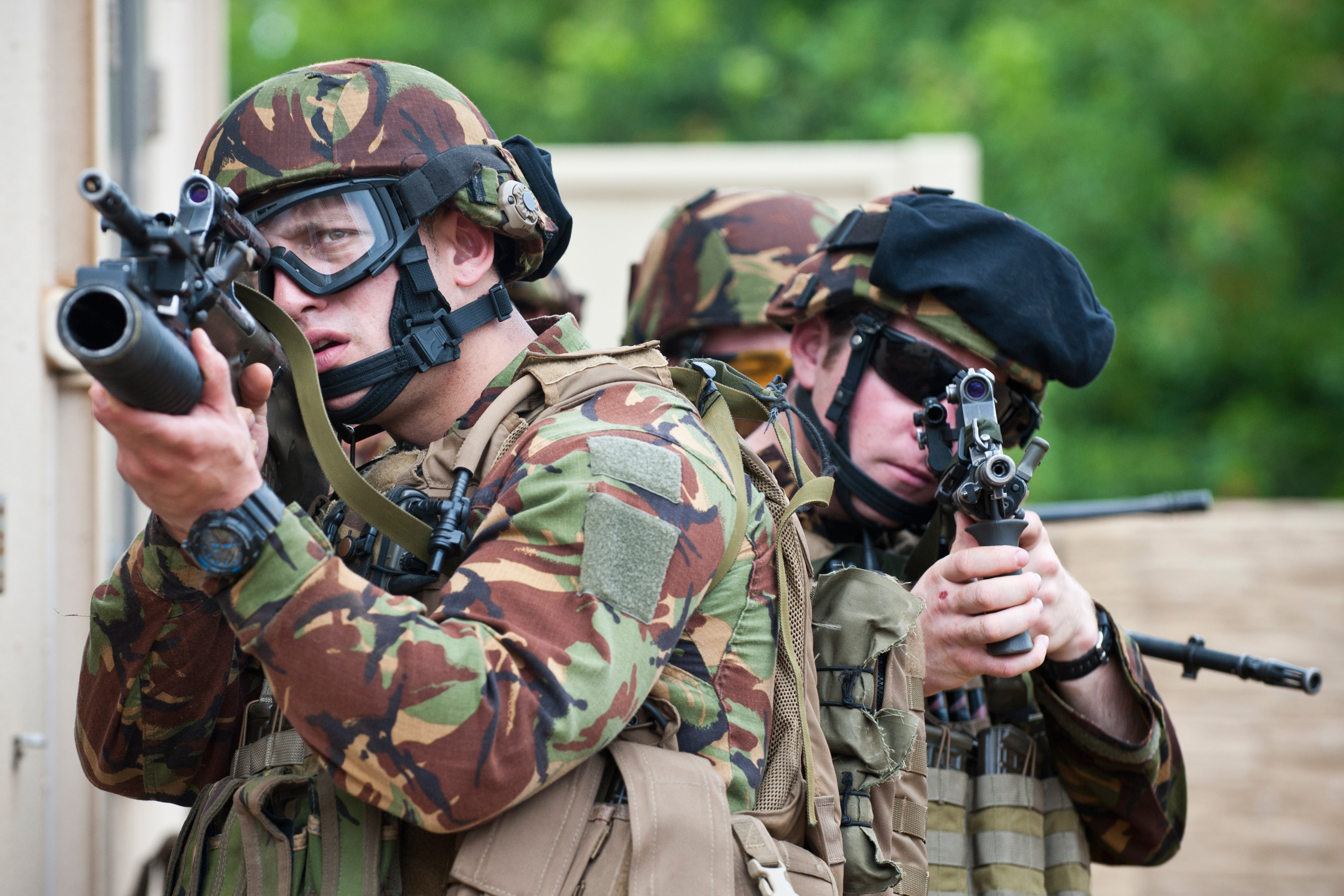
New Zealand soldiers in the 2008 variant, in 2012

In late 2008, the New Zealand Army commenced issue of a new combat uniform. It was still in the 1997 NZDPM colours, but made in ripstop material and in a new cut somewhat similar to the U.S. Army Combat Uniform. Velcro patches on the arms enable the wearer to display removable identifying badges, such as the New Zealand flag and the round Kiwi bird emblem, as used in overseas deployments.

A NZDDPM version of the 2008 combat uniform was issued for use in Afghanistan, the Sinai and Lebanon. NZDDPM was replaced in 2014 with New Zealand Multi-Terrain Pattern.

== New Zealand Cadet Forces ==
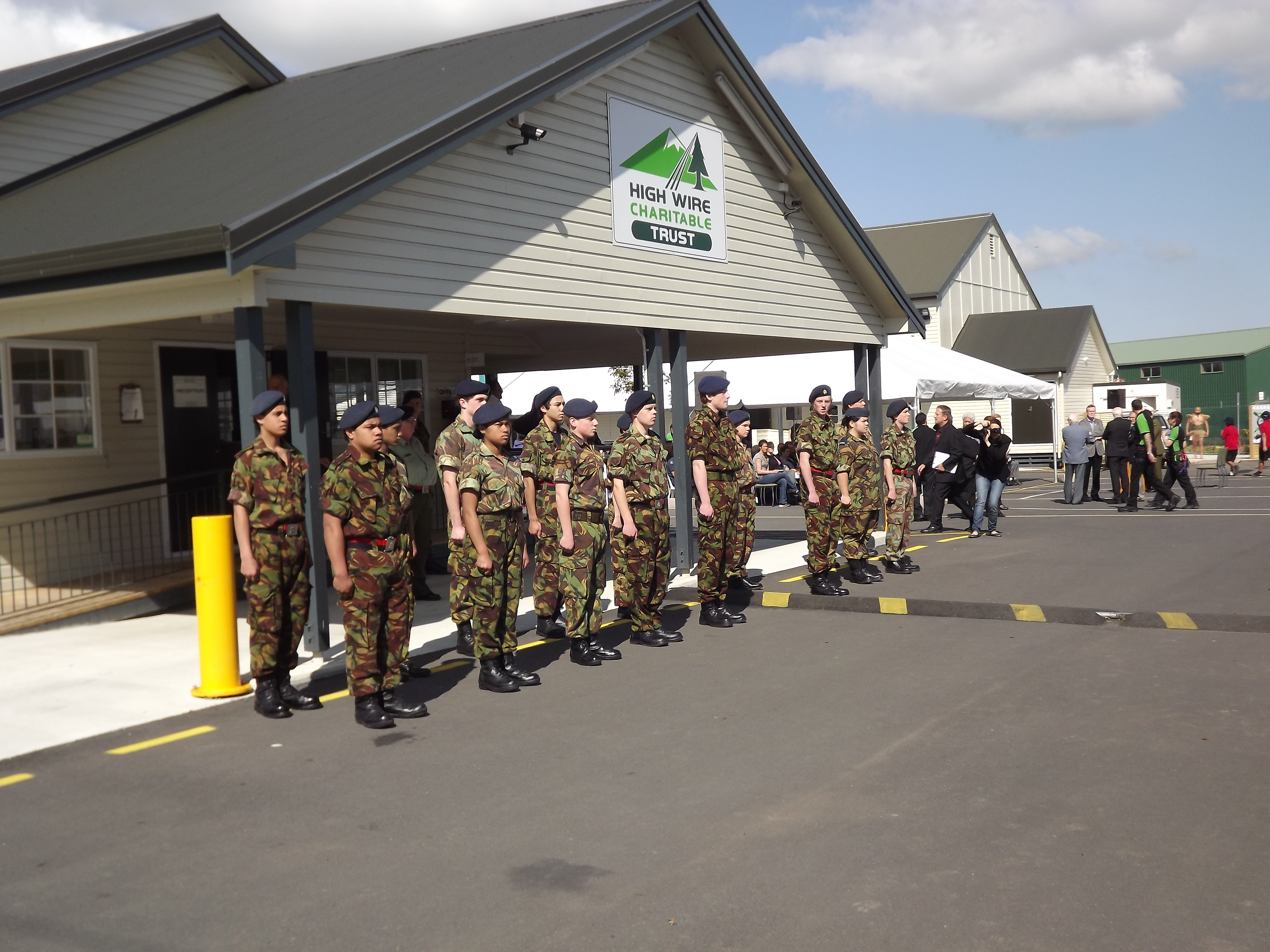
New Zealand cadets wearing NZDPM in 2011

Examples of the temperate variant of NZDPM are also worn by the New Zealand Cadet Forces.

== See also ==
- Disruptive Pattern Material
