= New Zealand multi-terrain pattern =

Military camouflage pattern since 2020

New Zealand Multi-Terrain Pattern (also known by the acronym NZMTP) is the standard camouflage pattern of the New Zealand Defence Force (NZDF). It replaced the multi-terrain camouflage uniform (MCU) and older New Zealand disruptive pattern material (NZDPM) variants beginning in 2020. The pattern is derived from the British Multi-Terrain Pattern (MTP), itself based on Crye Precision's Multicam.

== History ==
Prior to NZMTP, the NZDF issued the MCU (Multi Terrain Camouflage Uniform), introduced in the 2010s. While MCU was designed to be versatile, reasons for the change included feedback from operational deployments—especially in the Middle East and Pacific region which highlighted the need for a more adaptable camouflage pattern, poor uniform fitting for female service personnel, and all round subpar performance of the camouflage pattern itself.

The NZDF selected a pattern based on the British MTP, which offered proven effectiveness across multiple environments. NZMTP was introduced in trials around 2019 and began formal distribution in 2020. By 2023, it had replaced the MCU as the standard camouflage uniform for most NZDF personnel.

The pattern was developed with help from Work Wear, the Army's clothing supply company.

== Design ==
An artists impression of the NZMTP camouflage pattern used by the New Zealand Defence Force.

NZMTP is visually similar to the British MTP and the original Multicam pattern. It uses a multi-environment color palette of greens, browns, and tans that blend effectively in woodland, desert, and transitional terrains.

Minor variations in fabric and coloration may distinguish NZMTP from its British counterpart, but the overall pattern layout remains close to MTP. The fabric is typically a ripstop or poly-cotton blend, with flame-resistant variants issued for specific roles.

== Adoption and Usage ==
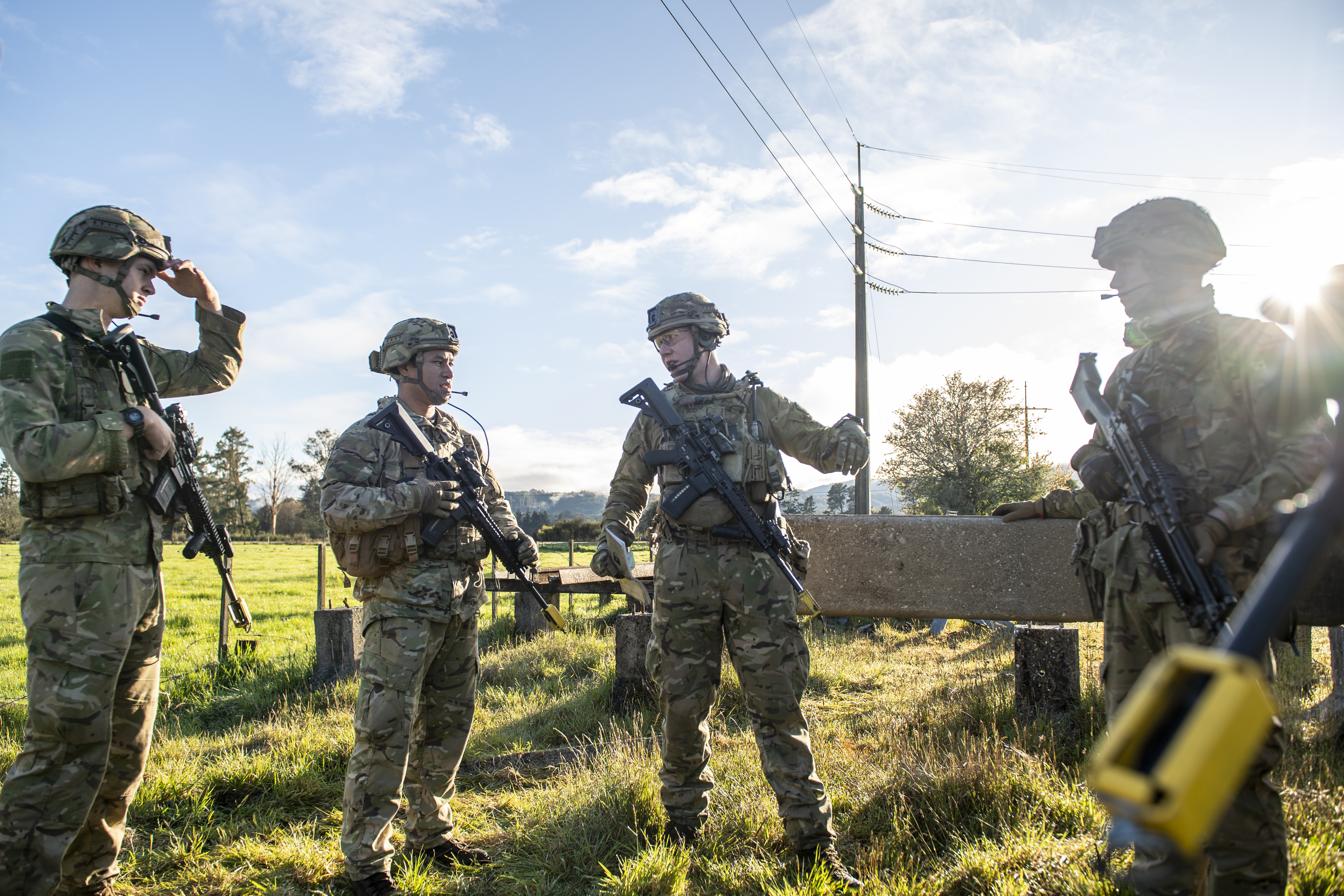
NZ Army soldiers wearing the NZMTP pattern.

NZMTP is used across the New Zealand Army, Royal New Zealand Navy (shore-based units), and Royal New Zealand Air Force for combat, training, and deployment operations. Elite or special operations units may continue to use different camouflage based on mission requirements.

== See also ==
- Camouflage
- New Zealand Army
- Military camouflage
- Multicam
