= Army Cadets =

Army Cadets may refer to:

- Army Cadet Force (UK)
- Combined Cadet Force#Army Section (UK), primarily in private schools
- New Zealand Cadet Corps
- Royal Canadian Army Cadets
- Australian Army Cadets
- Corps of Cadets at the United States Military Academy
  - Army Black Knights, formerly known as the Cadets
