= New Zealand Cadet Corps =

- Active: 1864 - present
- Country: New Zealand
- Allegiance: HM The King
- Branch: Army
- Type: Volunteer Youth Organisation
- Size: 34 Units
- Part of: New Zealand Cadet Forces
- Headquarters: Trentham Military Camp
- Nicknames: Army Cadets; Green team Moles
- Website: www.cadetforces.org.nz

Commanders
- Minister of Defence: Hon Chris Penk
- Chief of Defence Force: Air Marshal Tony Davies
- Commandant NZCF: Wing Commander Bruce Creedy, RNZAF
- Executive Officer NZCF: Squadron Leader Bruce Sinclair, RNZAF
- Assistant Commandant: Wing Commander Shane Cole, NZBM QSM NZCF
- Warrant Officer Cadet Forces: Vacant

Insignia
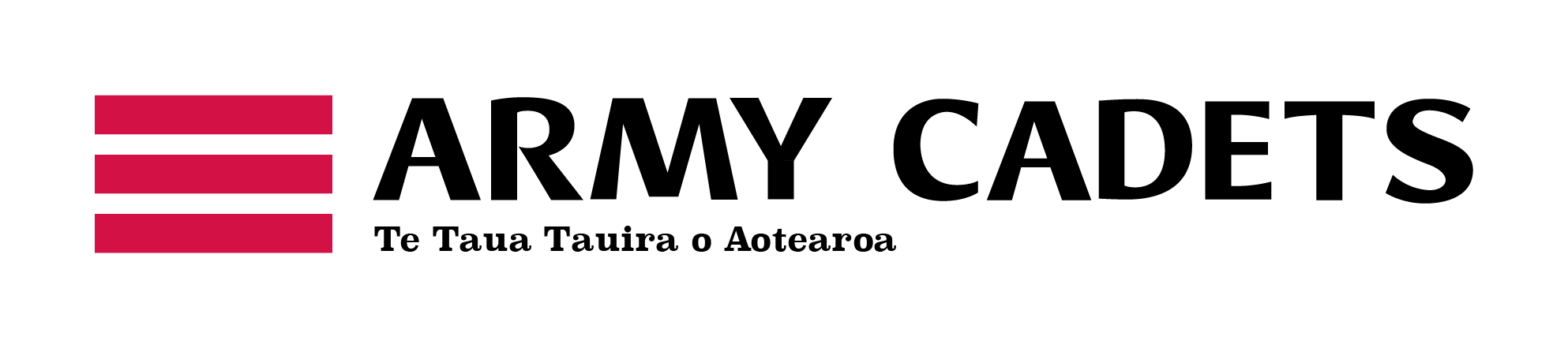
- New Zealand Army Cadets Logo

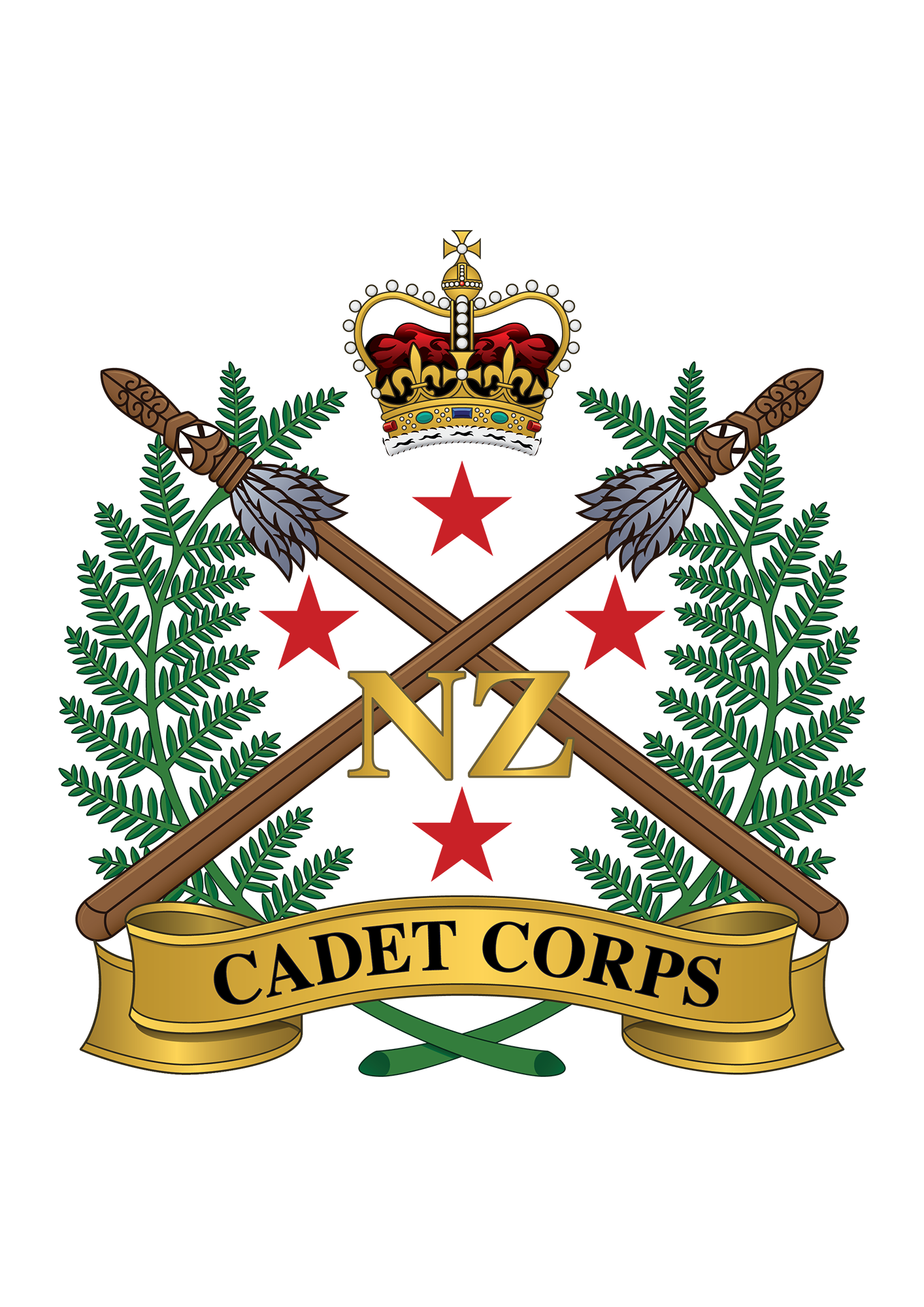
- New Zealand Cadet Corps Badge

The New Zealand Cadet Corps (also known as Army Cadets and NZCC) is one of the three corps in the New Zealand Cadet Forces, the other two being the Air Training Corps, and Sea Cadet Corps. There is no reference to the Army within the official title of the NZCC, but an army theme is used for the NZCC. All of its members, from the cadets themselves to the officers and the support committees are civilian volunteers. Members have no obligation to head into the New Zealand Defence Force (NZDF); however, some do choose to join the NZDF.

The modern New Zealand Cadet Forces has seen the former School Cadets transform into the "New Zealand Cadet Corps" and integrated with the New Zealand Air Training Corps and New Zealand Sea Cadet Corps. The New Zealand Cadet Corps has strengthened its ties with the New Zealand Army, with units of the New Zealand Army directly sponsoring and supporting individual Cadet Corps units.

== Organisation ==
=== National ===
The NZCC is managed at a national level by the commandant (usually a regular force lieutenant-colonel/wing commander/commander), and their staff based out of Trentham Army Camp. It is supported by the Cadet Corps Association of New Zealand.

=== Area ===
The country is divided into 3 areas, Northern (Northern half of the North Island), Central (Southern half of the North Island) and Southern (entire South Island). Each area has a NZCF Training and Support Unit (CFTSU), commanded by NZDF Senior Non-commissioned Officer or Commissioned Officer. Area Coordinator, with advisors for Cadet Corps units.

=== Unit ===
Each unit is led and managed by the Cadet Unit Commander, and their officers and staff.

A typical unit has between one and four officers filling various roles. The Cadet Unit Commander appoints all personnel in the unit to their positions. Each unit has an Adjutant, Training Officer, and Stores Officer. These positions are usually filled by a commissioned officer (officers can hold multiple positions if necessary). One or more of the positions may have assistants, the assistants are often junior officers or Senior NCOs.

Each unit also has a cadet NCO holding the position of Company Sergeant Major (holding the rank of Warrant Officer Class Two). If the unit is large enough, each platoon of cadets may have a Staff Sergeant. The Company Sergeant Major (CSM) is normally responsible for supervising the NCOs in their various tasks, as a result, the Company Sergeant Major can skip the normal chain of command, enabling them to liaise directly with the Unit Commander. Some Cadet Corps units also permit and hold a drill cane for the Company Sergeant Major to use, or the unit Staff Sergeant.

Some Cadet Corps units also utilise the position of 'Drill Sergeant'. Typically holding either the rank of either Sergeant or Staff Sergeant. The role of a Drill Sergeant is to ensure discipline of personnel while undertaking drill. This frees up the Sergeant Major to oversee other unit matters.

== Uniform and Insignia ==
=== Insignia and Badges ===
The working uniform worn by NZCC members is the now retired New Zealand Army Uniform (NZDPM), the ranks are the same as the New Zealand Army, however, lettering on the bottom of the rank insignia shoulder boards reads "CADET FORCES" rather than "NEW ZEALAND" to differentiate NZCC personnel from New Zealand Army personnel. Furthermore, NZCC rank insignia are red, a colour no longer used by the New Zealand Army for rank insignia. Officer service dress uniforms have a shoulder flash reading "NEW ZEALAND CADET FORCES", rather than "NEW ZEALAND" for the same reason. The cadets wear the New Zealand Cadet Corps badge on their beret and if their unit has a colour patch this is worn behind the badge.

Cadets wear a shoulder brassard on their right arm to display their individual achievements and to further distinguish them from NZ Army personnel. Cadet achievements include Duke of Edinburgh's Award, Cadet Corps Skills badge, marksman badge and training level badges, as well as the name of the unit they parade with.

Commissioned Officers, Officer Cadets', National and Area Warrant Officers do not wear brassards to distinguish themselves from unit level Warrant Officers.

=== Uniforms ===
The New Zealand Cadet Corps follows the New Zealand Army with regards to uniform standards and clothing items, with all mandatory clothing being issued by the NZ Army. In the past the system used was that a unit would be graded 1-5 based on the quantity of personnel that attended a units parade night. Based on that grading the unit would then be issued an annual allowance for the unit to order new uniform as replacements or to provide to new cadets. The New Zealand Cadet Corps currently operate the following uniforms;

Dress Code	Example	Notes
Dress 1B Service Dress – Formal		Commissioned Officers only
Dress 1C Service Dress All Ranks - Formal		Defined as informal dress, due to no jacket. Long sleeve and tie are the only differences. Only worn by SNCO's and Officers.
Dress 1D Service Dress – Casual		Defined as Casual Dress, due to no tie or jacket.
Dress 3A Parades and Ceremonial		New Zealand Disruptive Pattern Material NZCC Officers and Cadets. Worn for ceremonial activities, formal parades and as directed for representative duties; prioritises symbolism; sleeves up, shirt worn in and wearing Corps belt.
Dress 3B Unit Operations/ Activities		New Zealand Disruptive Pattern Material NZCC Officers and Cadets. Worn during normal Unit parade nights; prioritises functionality; sleeves up, shirt worn out and beret.
Dress 3C Field and Training		New Zealand Disruptive Pattern Material NZCC Officers and Cadets. Worn for training requirements and individual safety; prioritises multi-function and safety; is scalable to the training situation, the task, and environment.

== Ranks ==
All actively serving personnel within the New Zealand Cadet Corps have the opportunity to advance through the ranks while in the organisation.

=== Non-Commissioned Officer Ranks ===
Cadet Non-Commissioned Officer ranks are based on the ranks of the New Zealand Army, and are;

Rank	Abbreviation	Basic Requirements to be Awarded	Designation
Cadet Under Training	CDTUT	Enrol into a New Zealand Cadet Corps unit.	Cadet 0
Cadet	CDT	Complete the initial six month 'probationary' period.	Cadet 1
Lance Corporal	CDTLCPL	Completed Regimental training as per the NZCF 170c.; No disciplinary or performance issues.	Cadet 2
Corporal	CDTCPL	Successfully completed the NZCF Junior Non-Commissioned Officer Course.; Completed Corps training as per the NZCF 170c.; No disciplinary or performance issues.	Cadet 3
Sergeant	CDTSGT	Successfully completed the NZCF Senior Non-Commissioned Officer Course.; No disciplinary or performance issues.	Cadet 4
Staff Sergeant	CDTSSGT	Completed a minimum of six months serving in the rank of Sergeant.; No disciplinary or performance issues.	Cadet 5
Warrant Officer Class Two	CDTWOII	Must be in line for the position of Sergeant Major.; Complete a minimum of six months serving in the rank of Staff Sergeant.; No disciplinary or performance issues.	Cadet 6
Warrant Officer Class One	CDTWOI	Appointees to Area Warrant Officers or Warrant Officer Cadet Forces positions only.; Approved by Commandant NZCF.	Cadet 7

The CDT prefix/suffix is used to distinguish regular force personnel from those of the cadet forces.

However, whilst not all cadets become NCOs, all get the chance to train and progress through the different levels of training, Basic, Regimental, Corps, and Advanced levels, by demonstrating knowledge and skills in subjects including cadet forces knowledge, general service knowledge, leadership, firearms safety.

The New Zealand Cadet Corps are the only branch of the New Zealand Cadet Forces that operate the Cadet 6 rank, Cadet Warrant Officer Class Two. Since personnel holding this rank hold the position of Sergeant Major, functionally they are treated the same as a Warrant Officer of the Sea Cadet Corps or Air Training Corps.

Historically personnel holding the rank of Warrant Officer Class Two and the position of Sergeant Major wore blank Cadet 1 rank slides and a wristband while wielding a pace stick signifying their rank and position. From 2014 onwards Cadet Warrant Officer Class Two rank slides were introduced and propagated to entirely replace the wristband, however in keeping with traditions some units still maintain the passage of this wristband from the preceding Sergeant Major to the incoming individual.

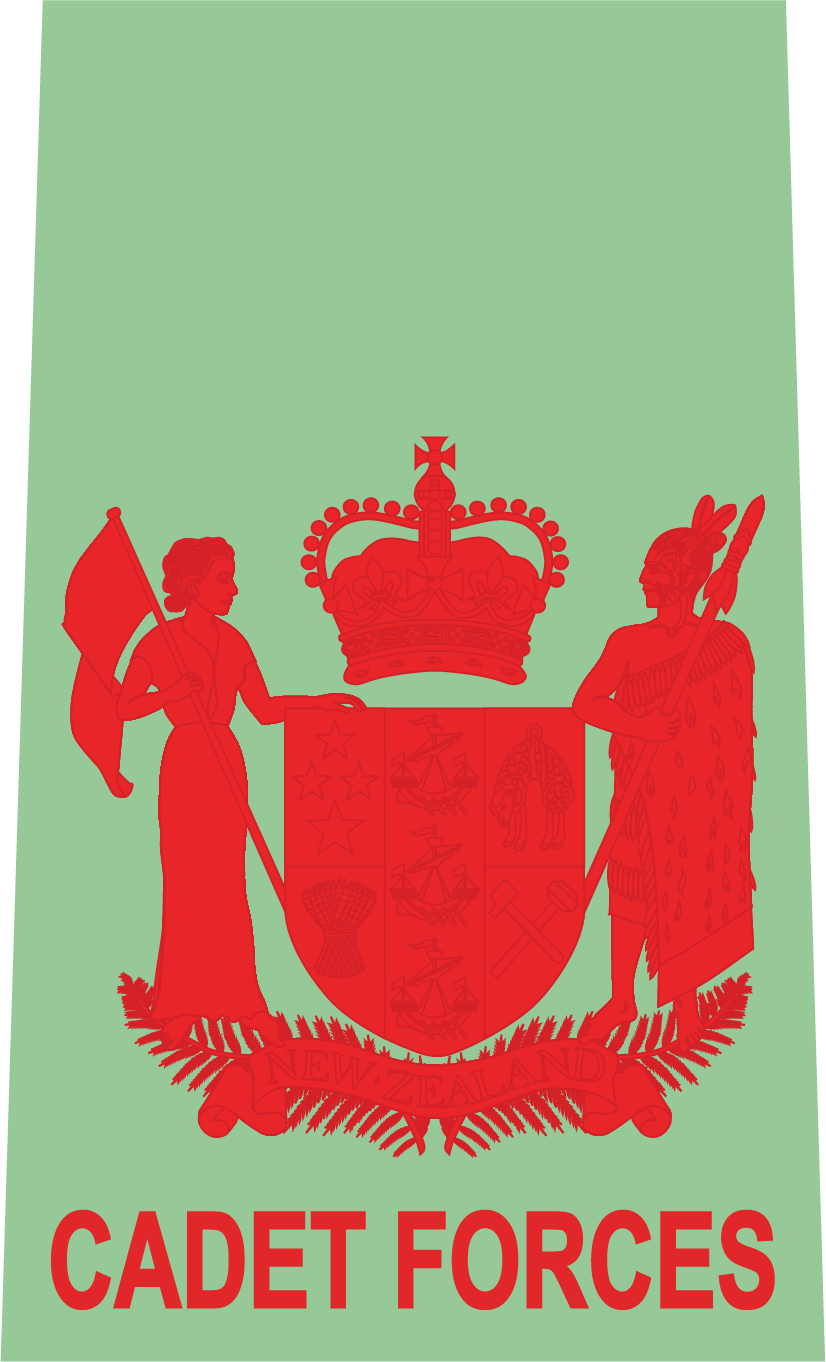
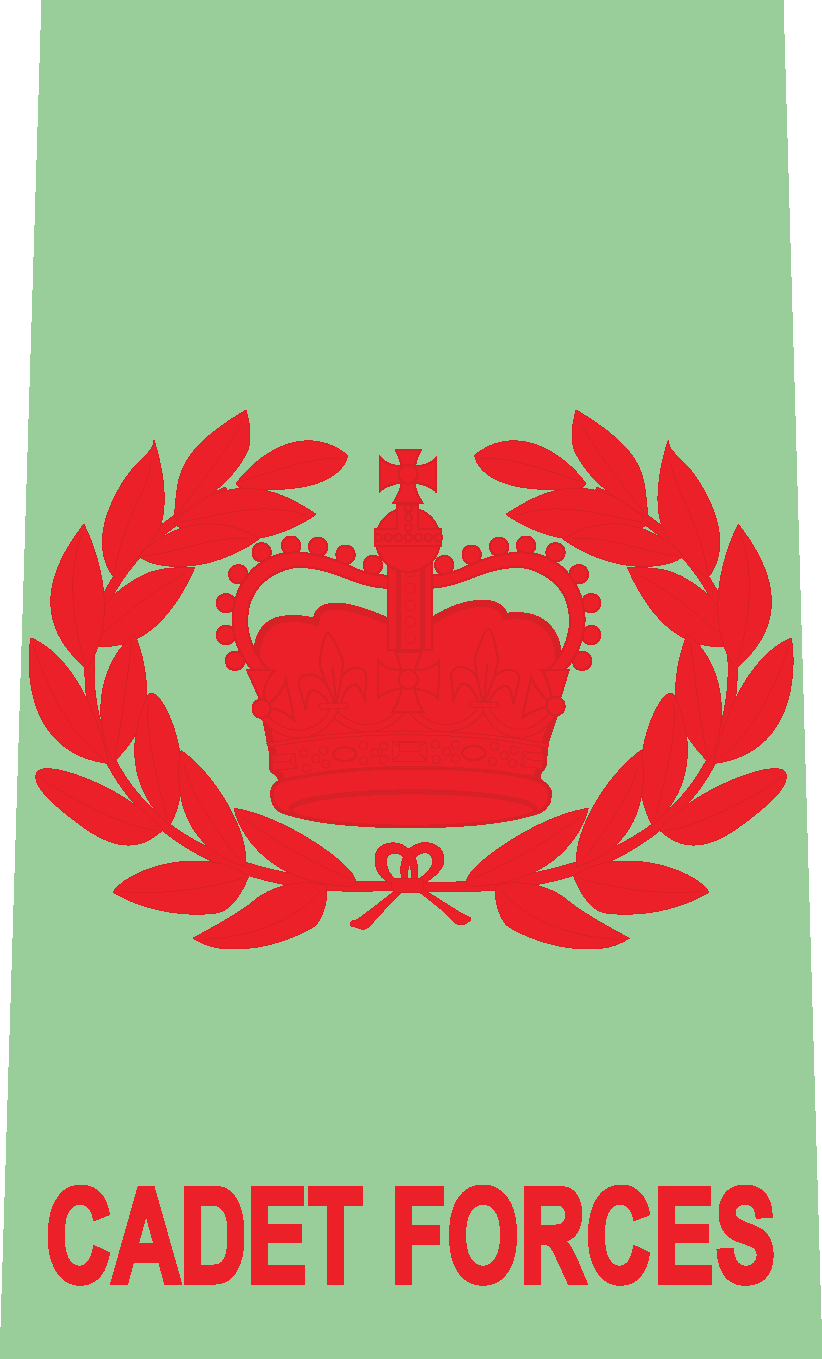
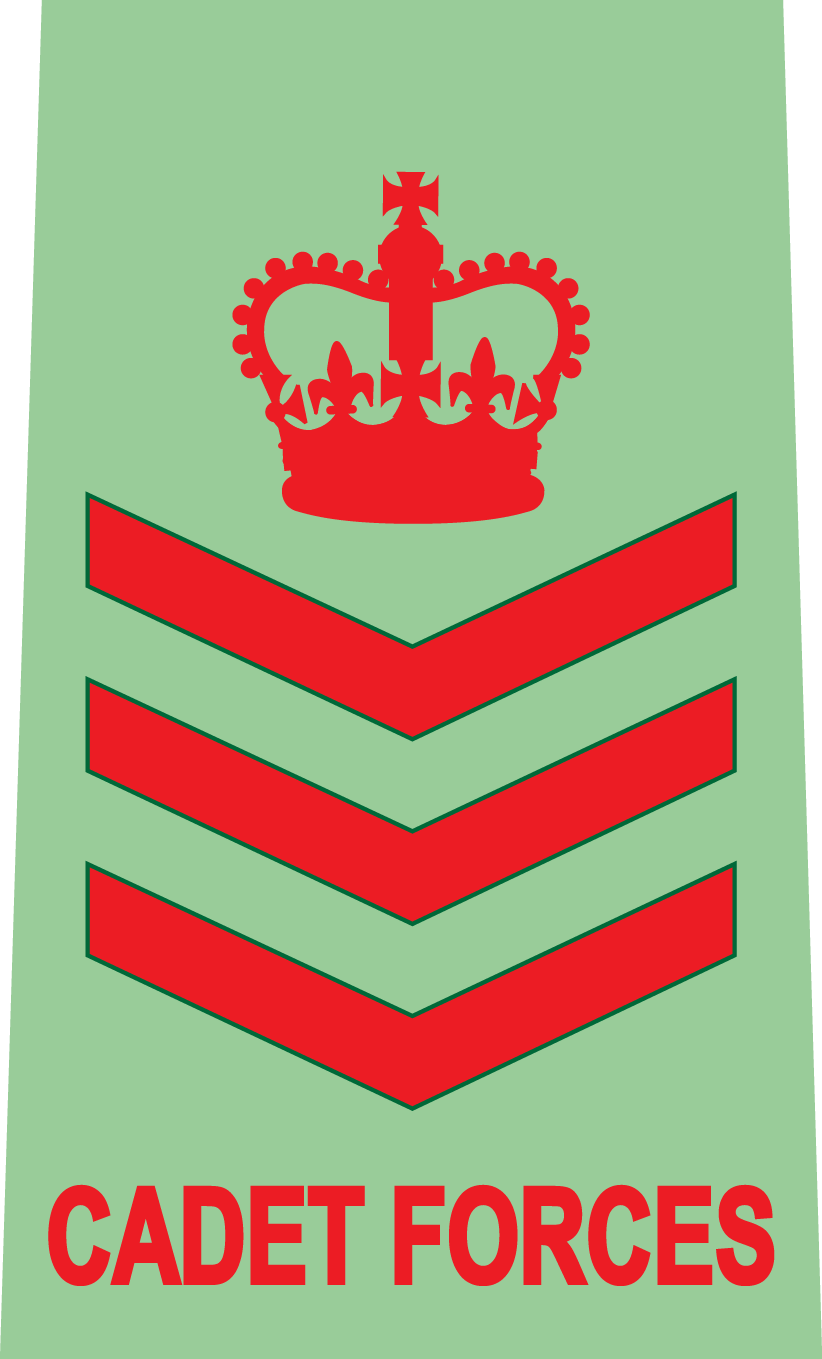
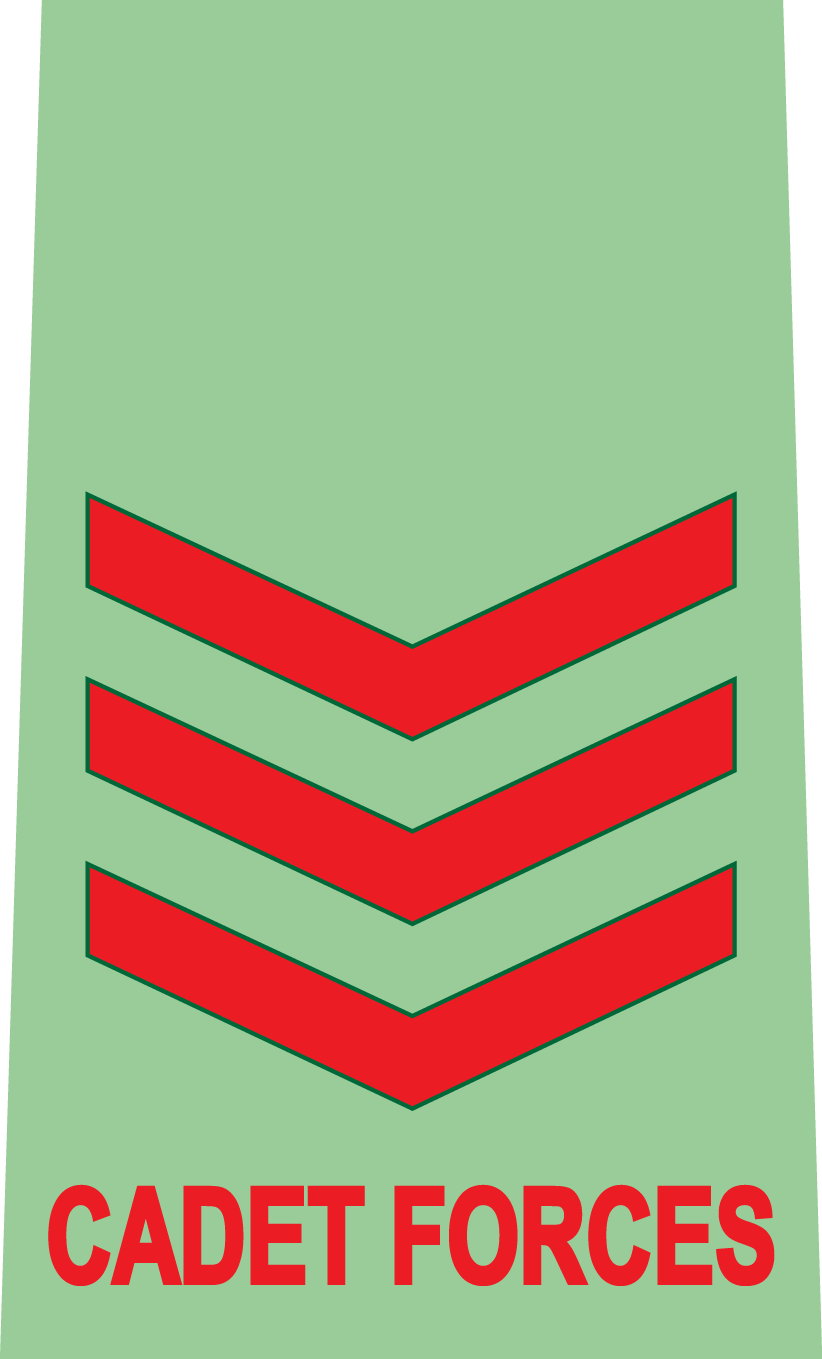
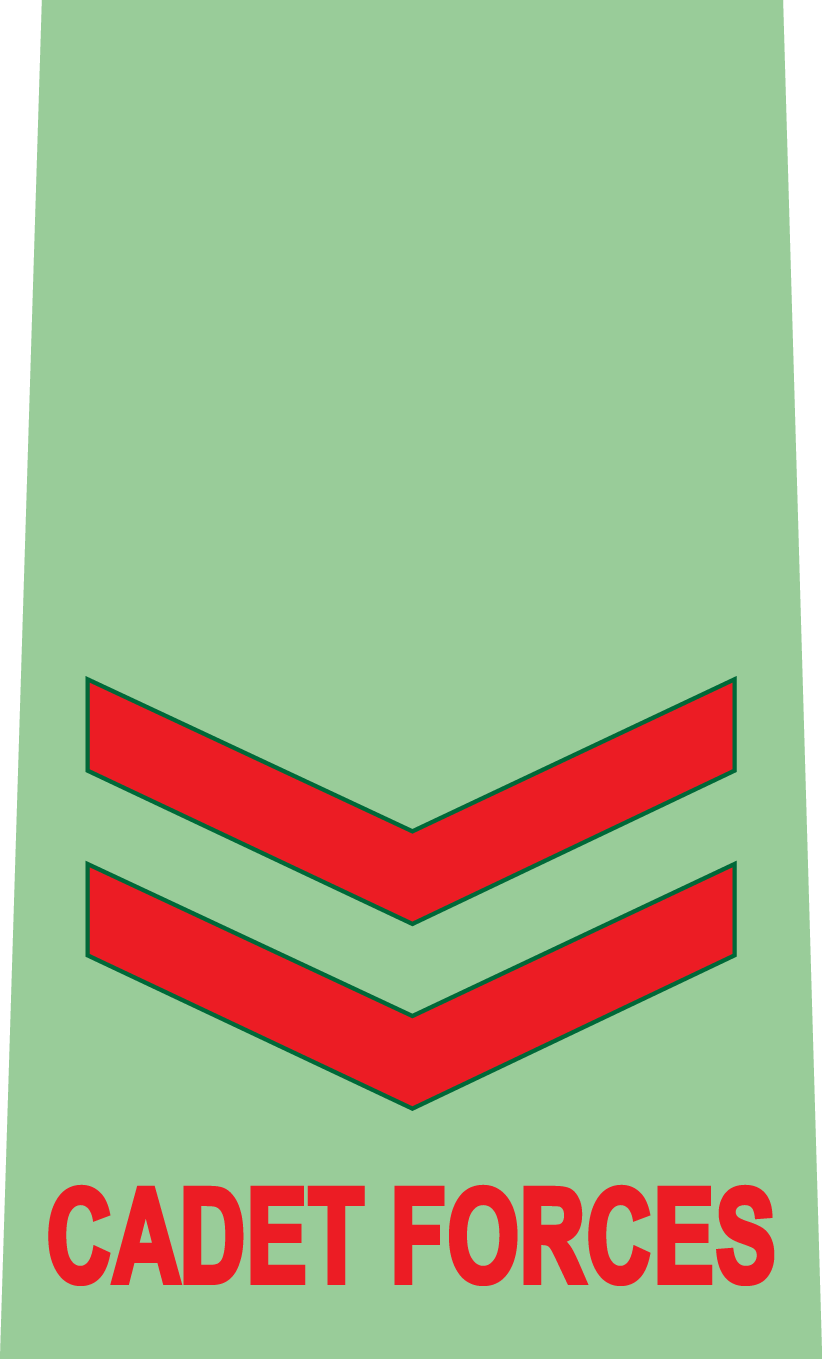
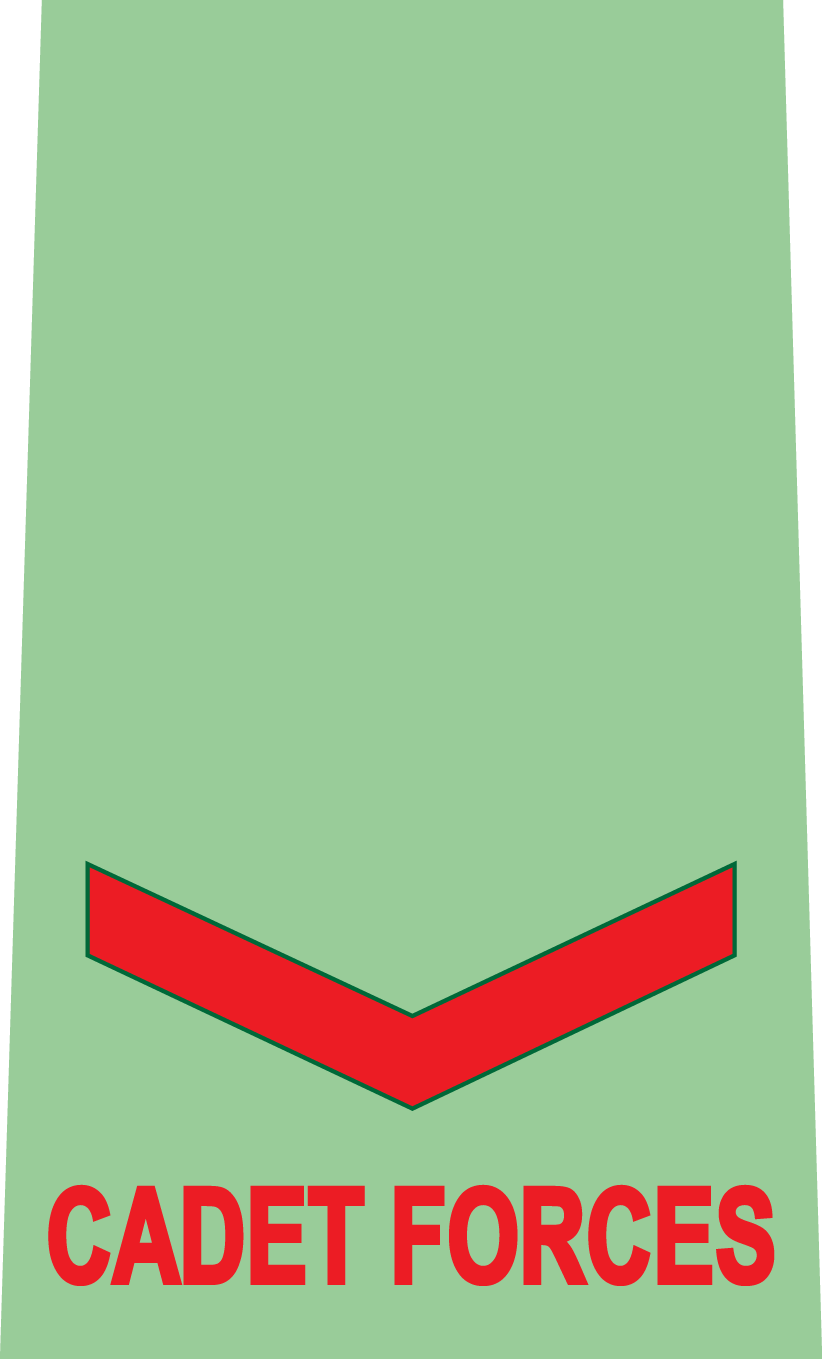
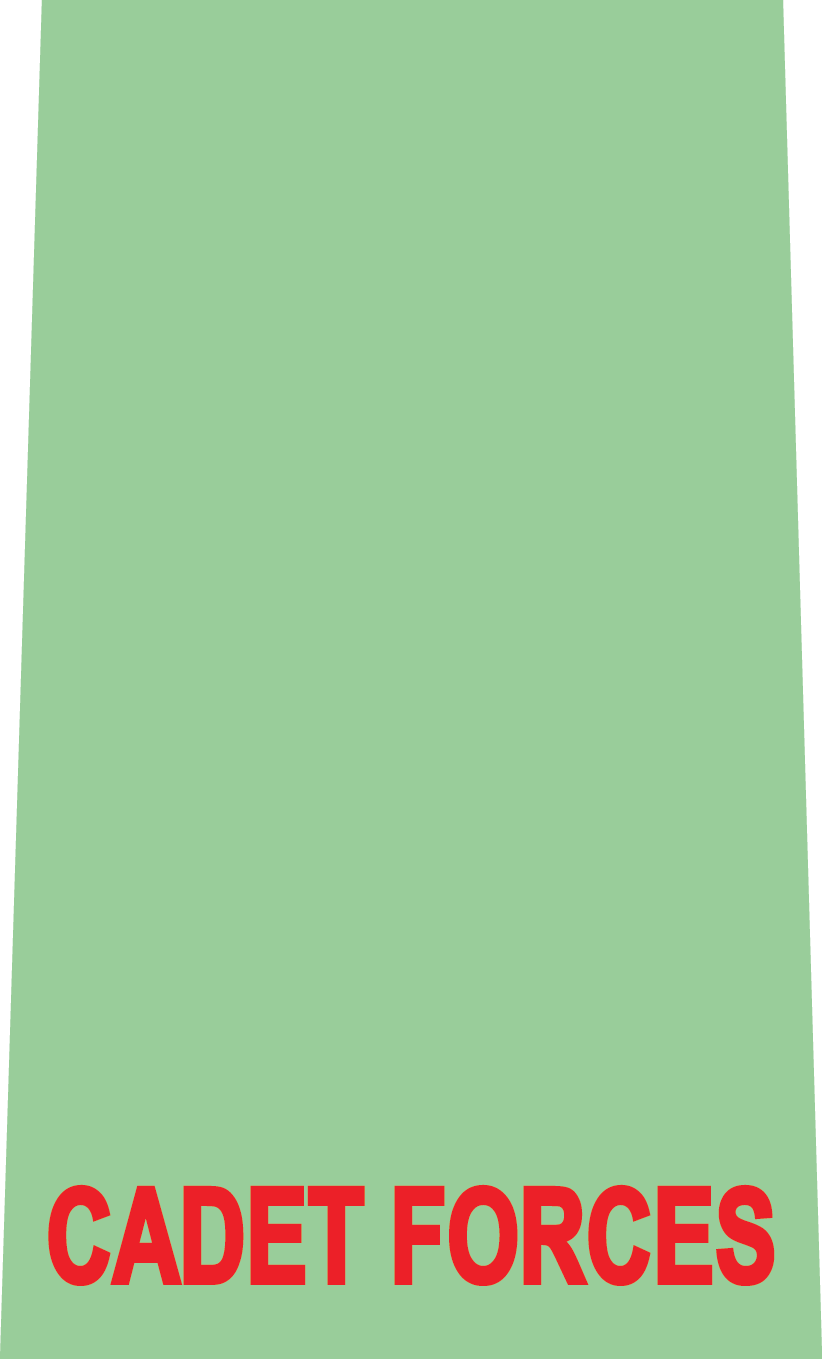
NZCF Cadets	CDT 7	CDT 6	CDT 5	CDT 4	CDT 3	CDT 2	CDT 1
New Zealand Cadet Corps
New Zealand Cadet Corps	Cadet Warrant Officer Class 1	Cadet Warrant Officer Class 2	Cadet Staff Sergeant	Cadet Sergeant	Cadet Corporal	Cadet Lance Corporal	Cadet
New Zealand Cadet Corps	CDTWO1	CDTWOII	CDTSSGT	CDTSGT	CDTCPL	CDTLCPL	CDT

=== Commissioned Officer Ranks ===
The Cadet Corps Commissioned Officer Ranks are based on the New Zealand Army, and are;

Note: All instances of Lieutenant are pronounced "Leftenant" in line with the United Kingdom Ministry of Defence pronunciation.

Rank	Abbreviation	General Requirements to be awarded	Designation
Officer Cadet	OFFCDT	Two entry paths; Serving cadet, upon turning 19 decide to commission upon which the rank will be awarded before the individuals next birthday.; Alternatively the direct entry option sees a civilian adult member decide they wish to commission, they will need to serve 6 months as 'supplementary staff' at the unit to establish whether the professional relationship is sustainable for both the unit and the individual, after 6 months and upon completion of the relevant online learning modules HQNZCF may award the rank of Officer Cadet. Note: this rank replaces Under Officer as of 2020. Historically this rank was only awarded for students attending NZCF Officer Commissioning courses.	OFF 1
Second Lieutenant	2LT	Be assessed by the Cadet Unit Commander as suitable and recommended for appointment to a confirmed commissioned.; Recommended by the Cadet Unit Commander and the Area Coordinator of the relevant Cadet Forces Training and Support Unit.	OFF 2
Lieutenant	LT	Have completed two years efficient service in the substantive rank of 2LT.; Successfully completed the Instructional and Training Management course; Recommended by Cadet Unit Commander and the Area Coordinator of the relevant Cadet Forces Training and Support Unit.	OFF 3
Captain	CAPT	Have completed four years efficient service in the substantive rank of LT.; Recommended by Cadet Unit Commander and the Area Coordinator of the relevant Cadet Force Training and Support Unit.	OFF 4
Major	MAJ	Have completed five years efficient service in the substantive rank of CAPT.; Successfully completed the NZCF Command Course and intend to serve either as a Cadet Unit Commander or Area Support Officer.; Recommended by Cadet Unit Commander and the Area Coordinator of the relevant Cadet Force Training and Support Unit.	OFF 5
Lieutenant colonel	LTCOL	Only the Assistant Commandant holds this rank.	OFF 6

Officer Ranks and Insignia in the NZCC

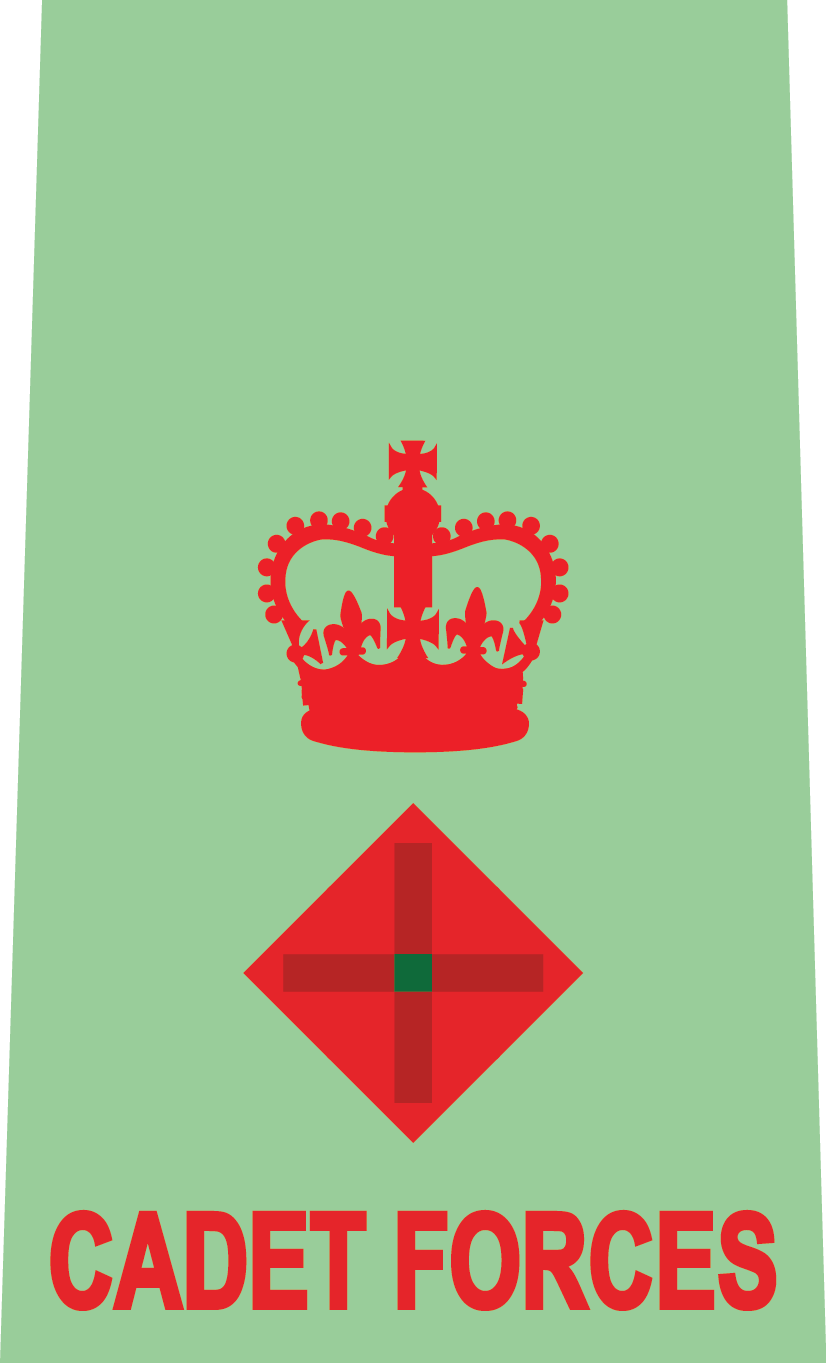
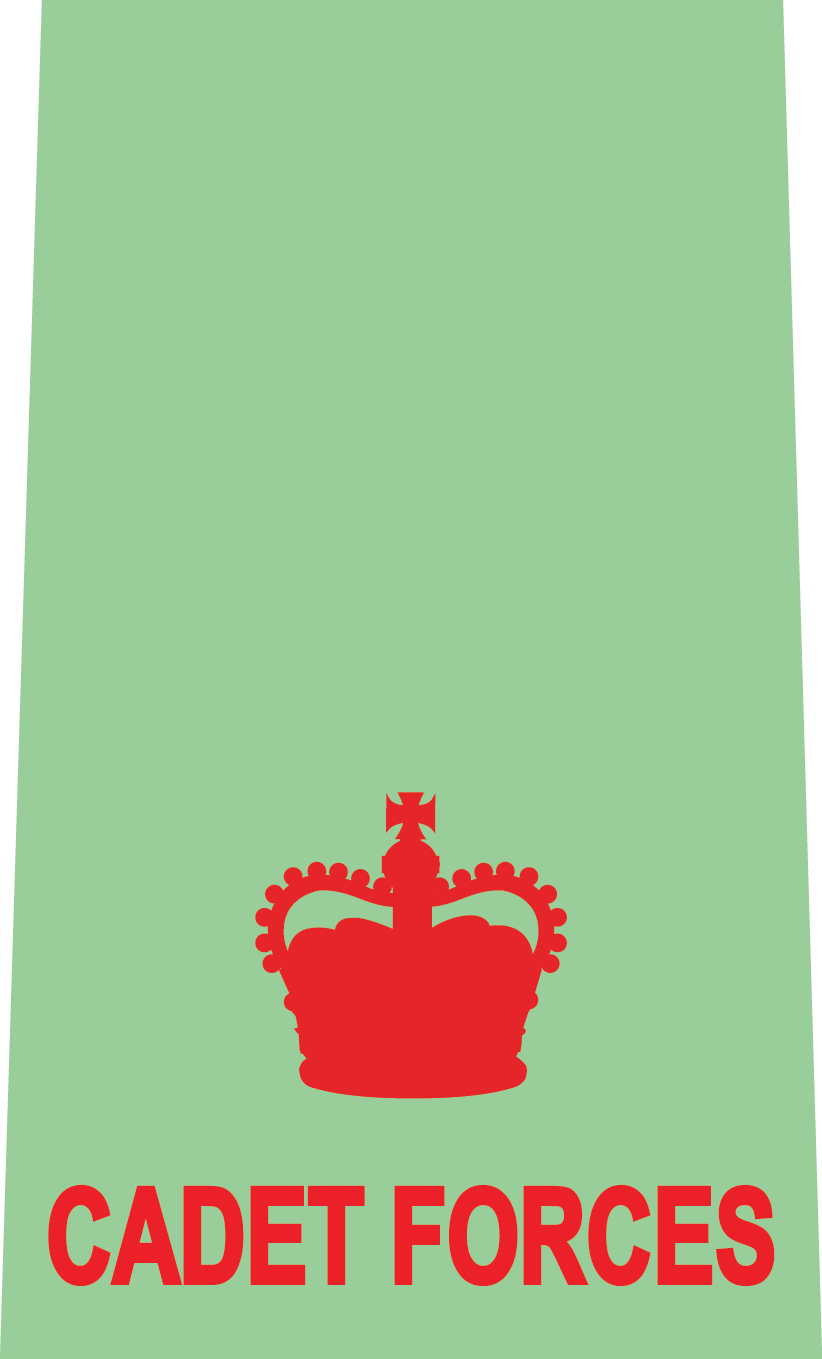
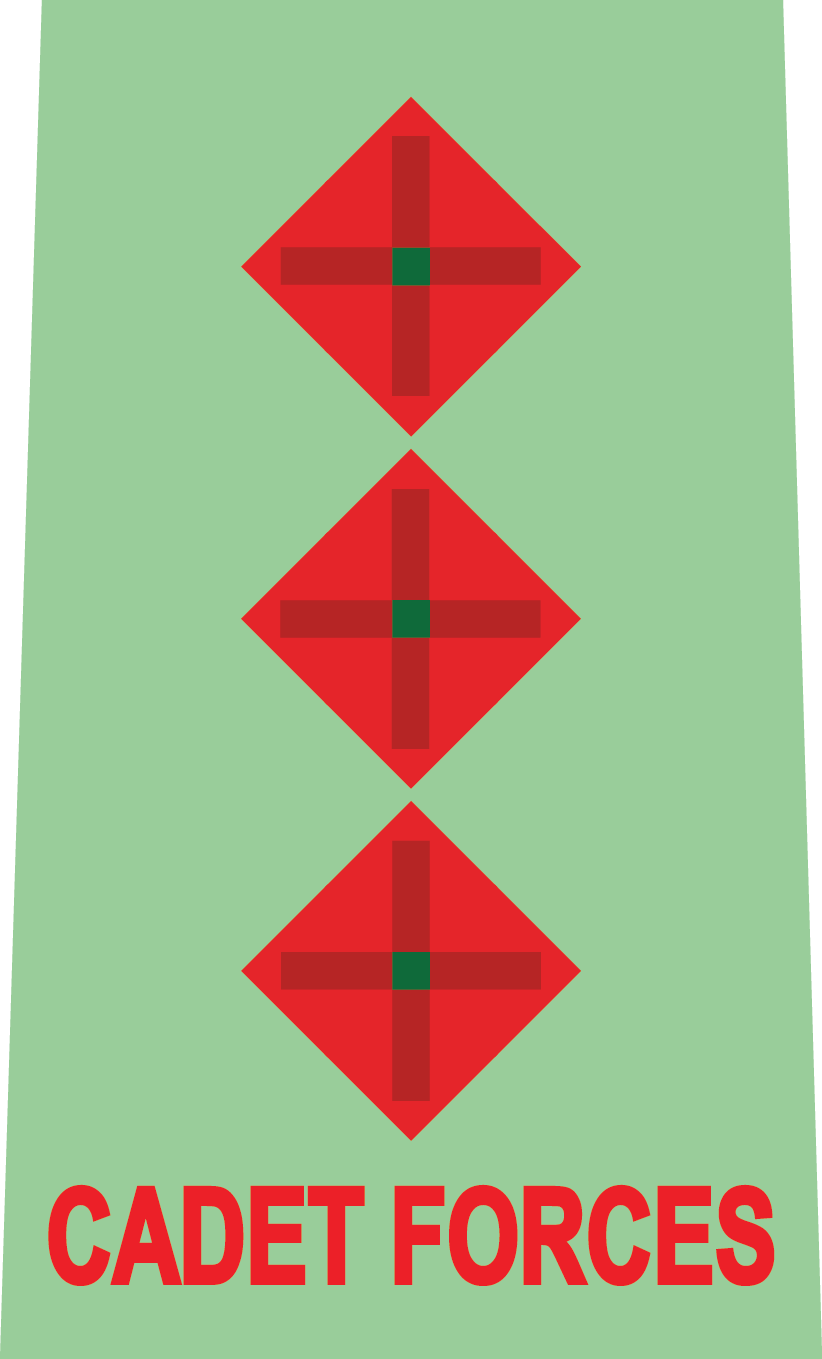
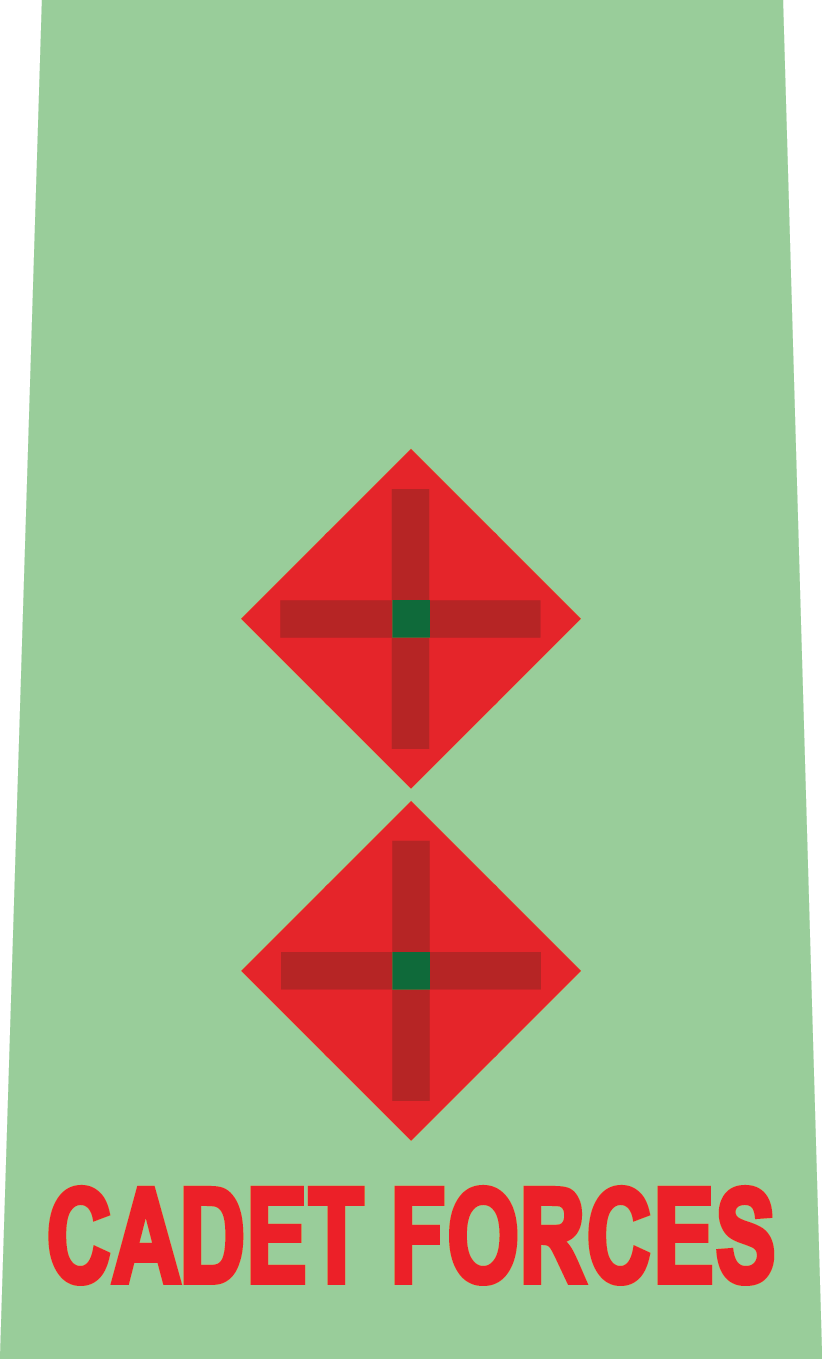
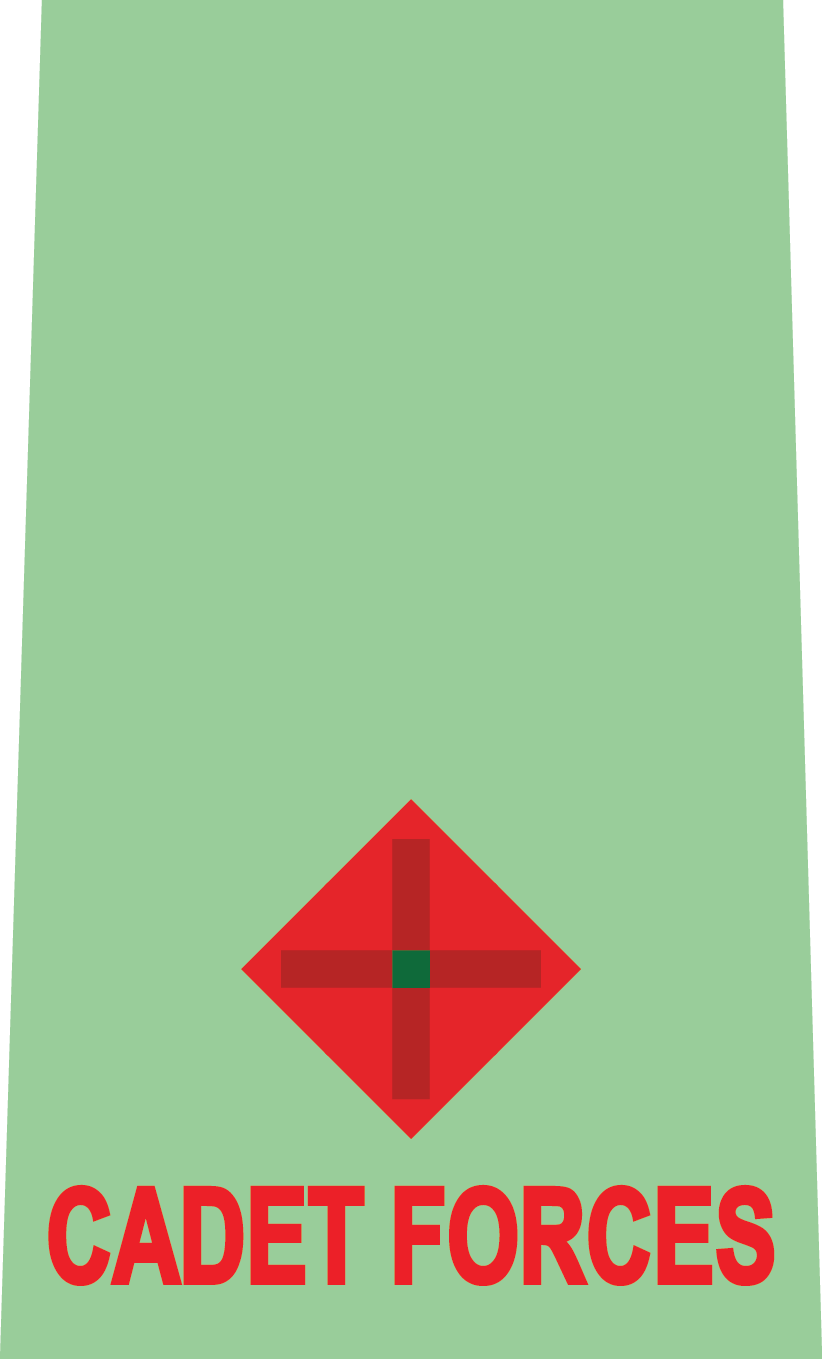
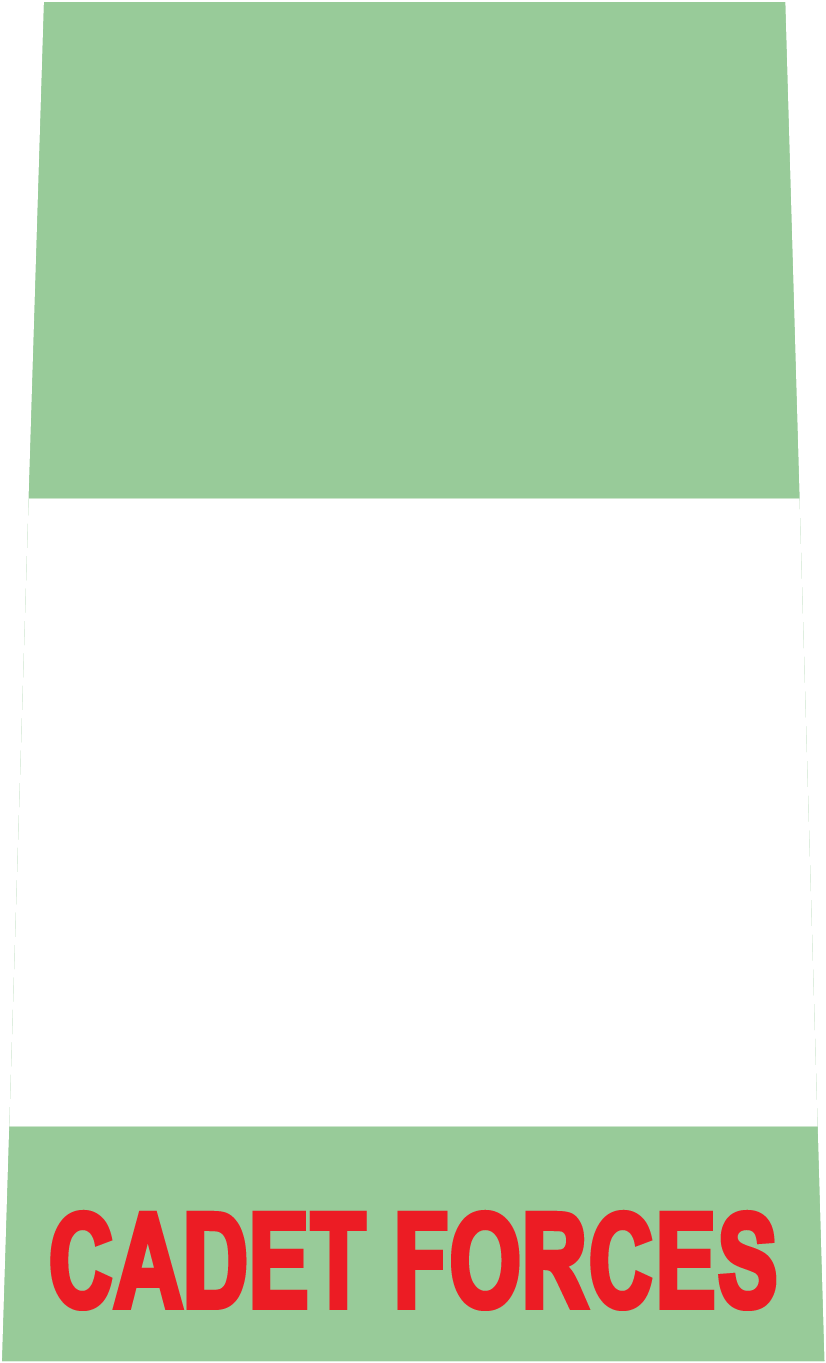
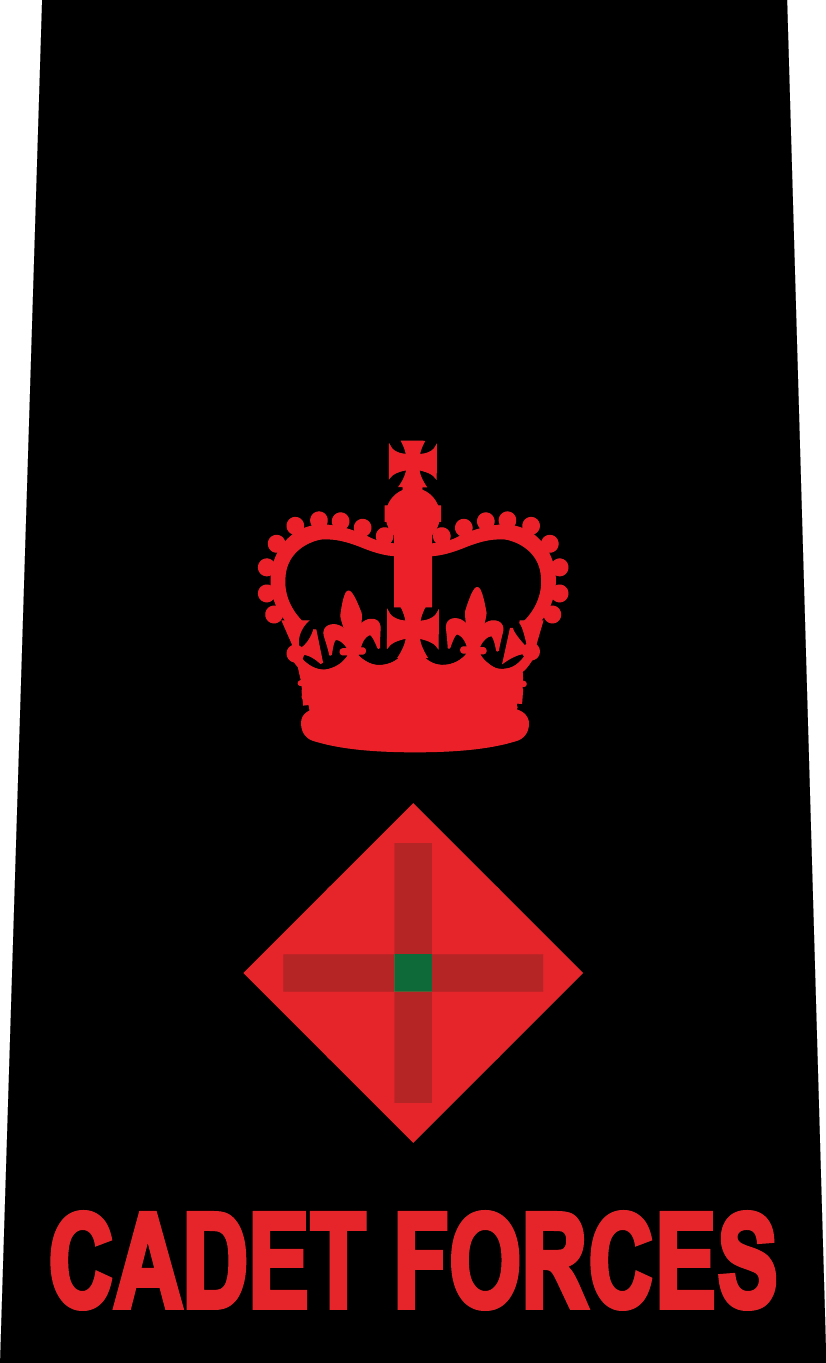
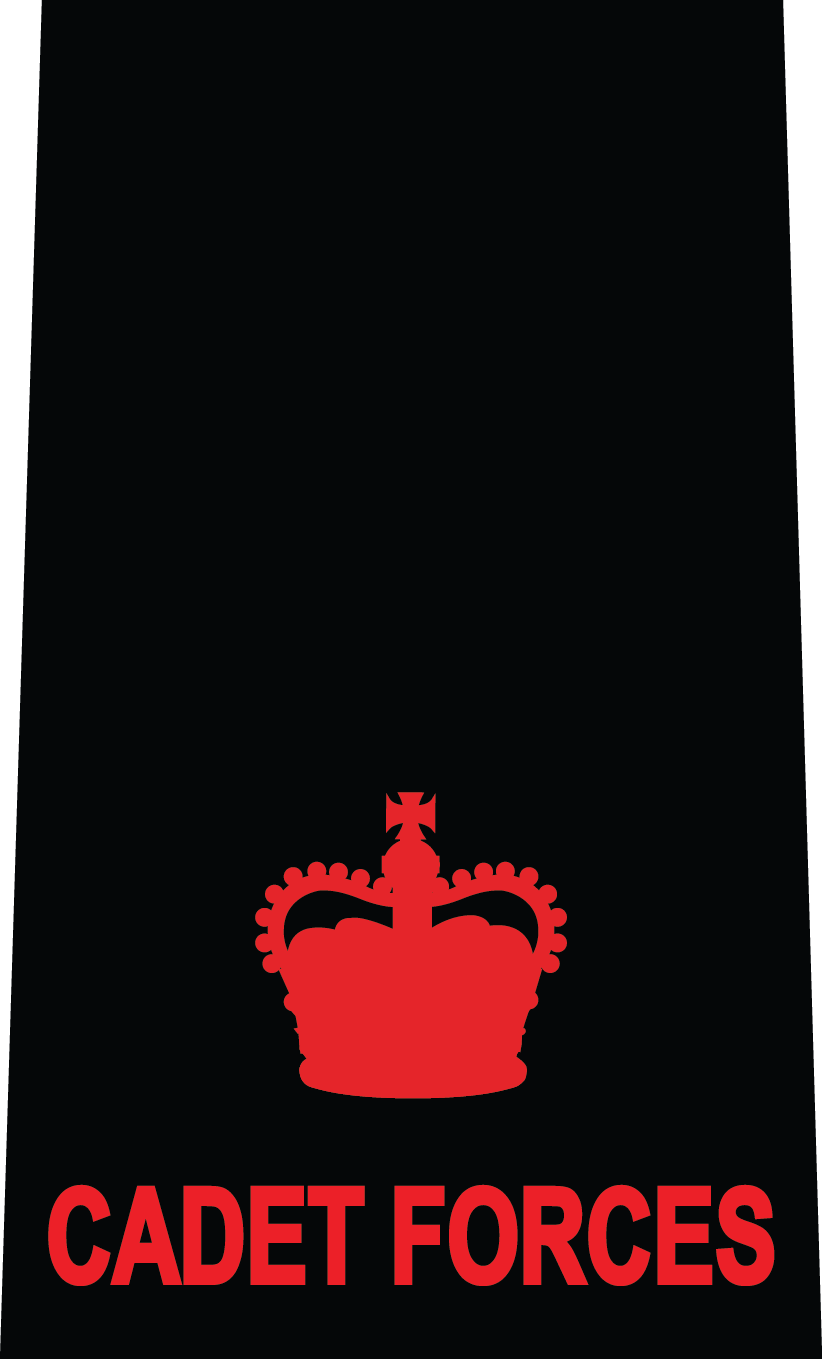
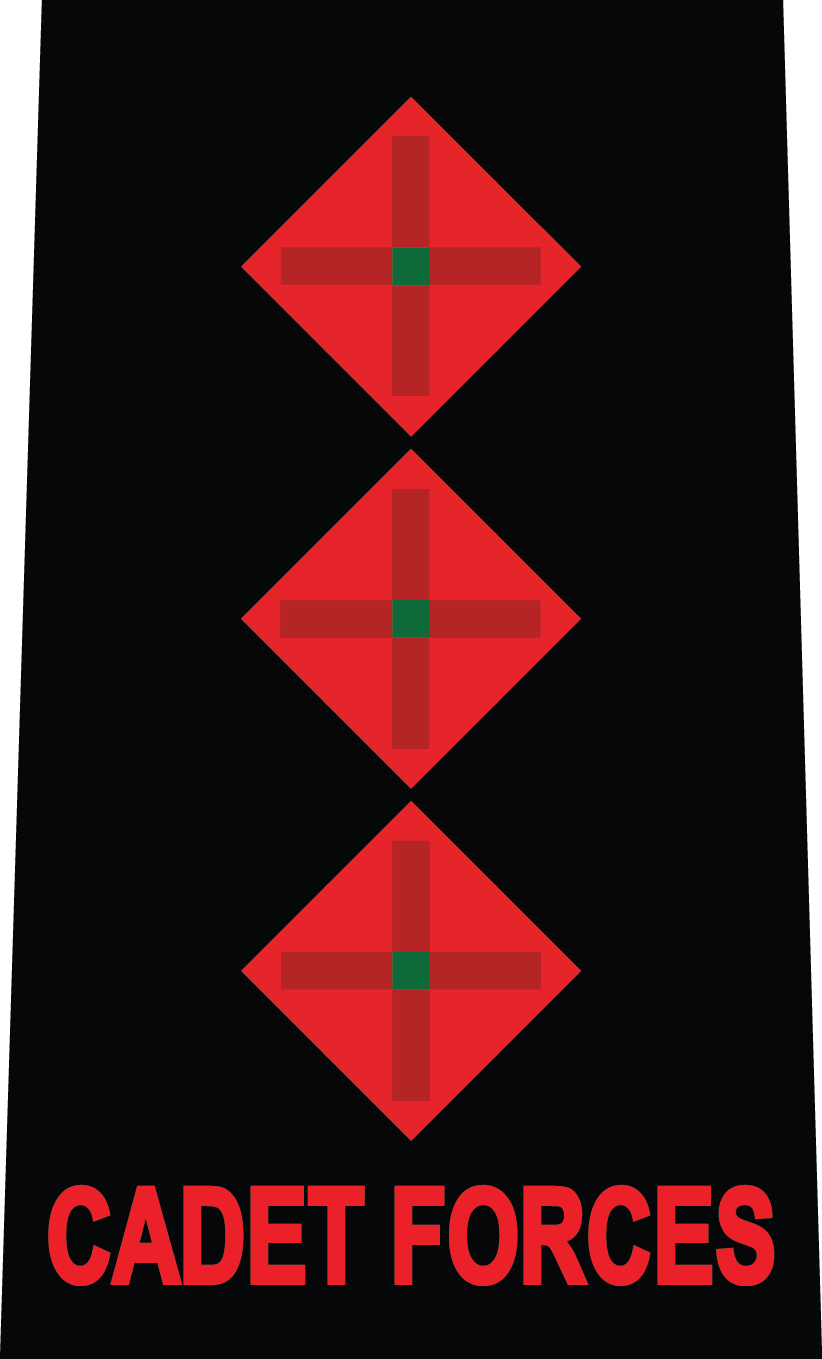
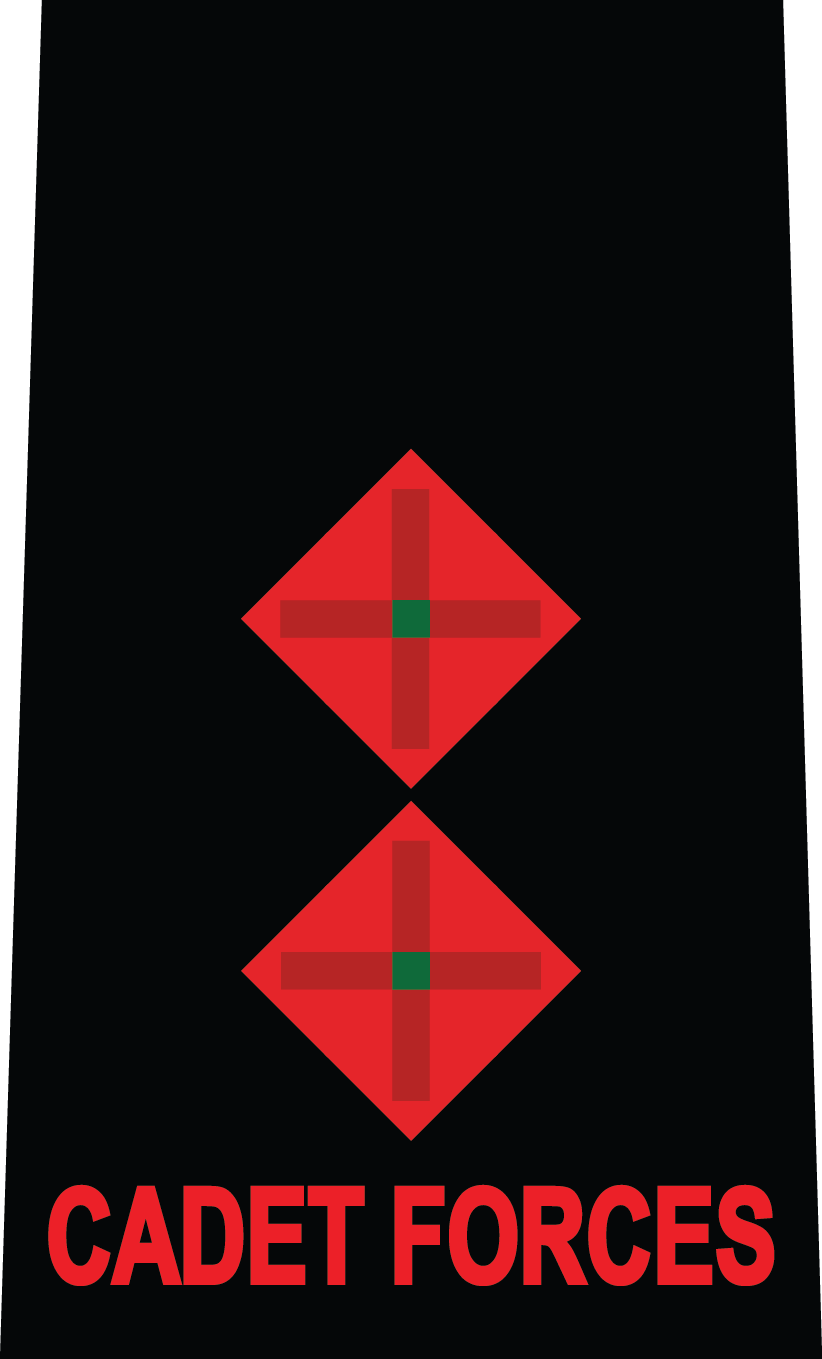
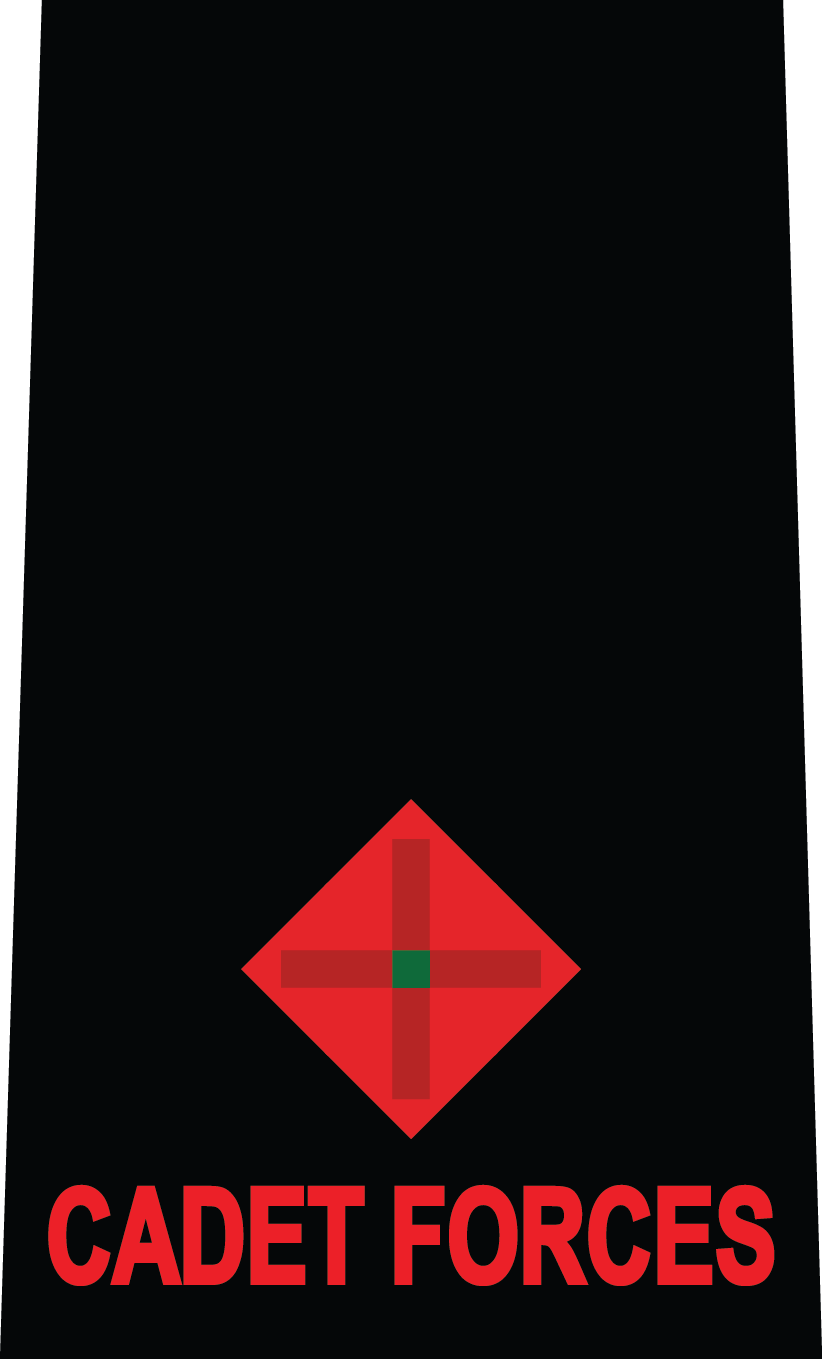
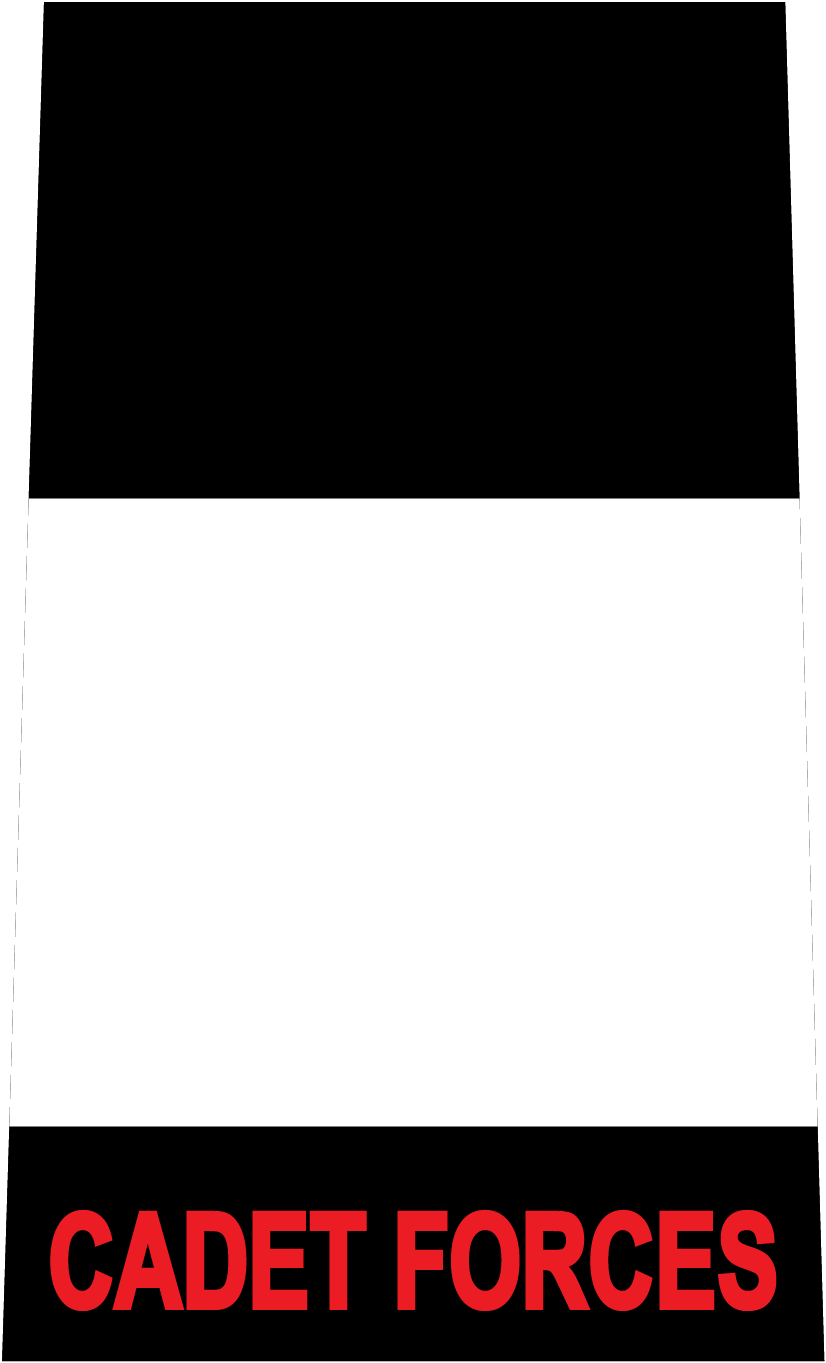
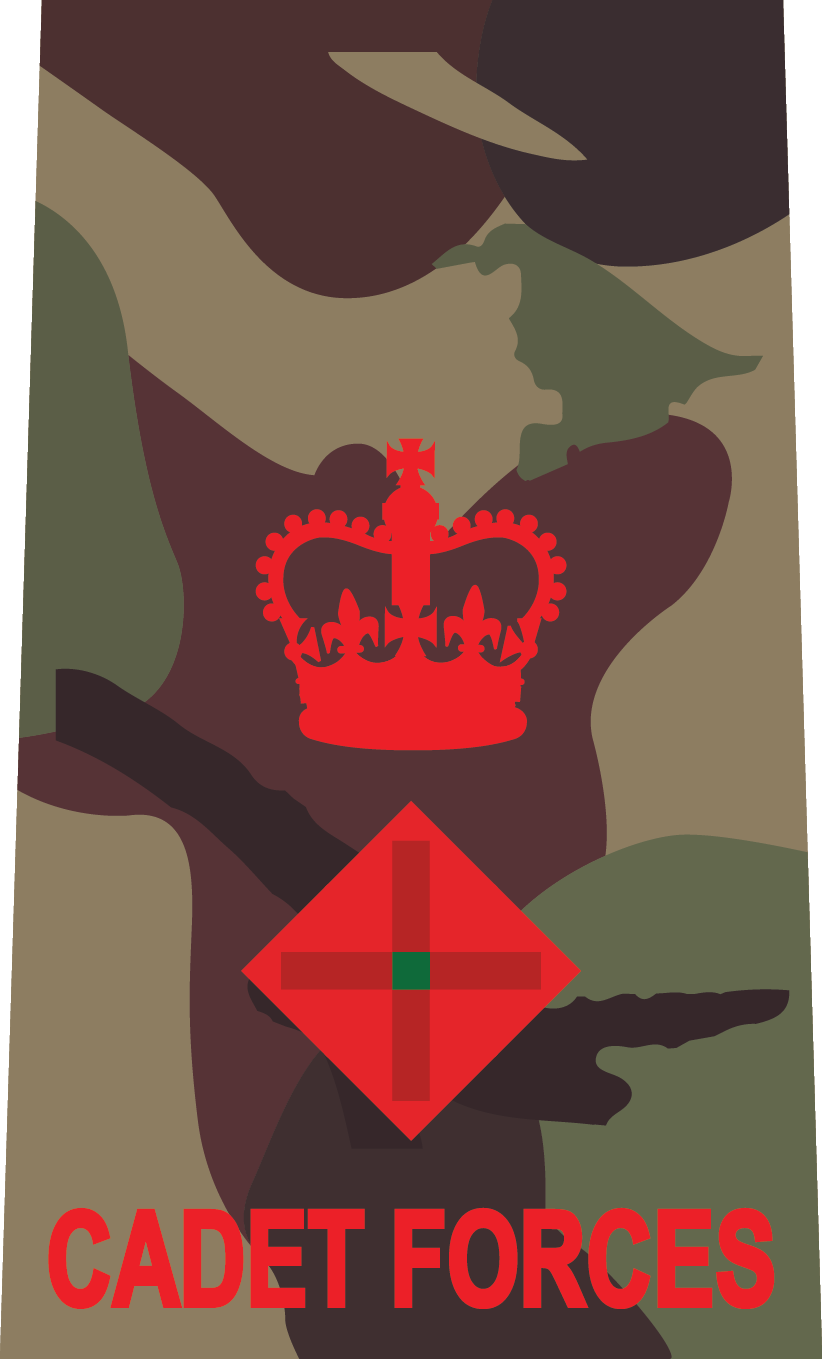
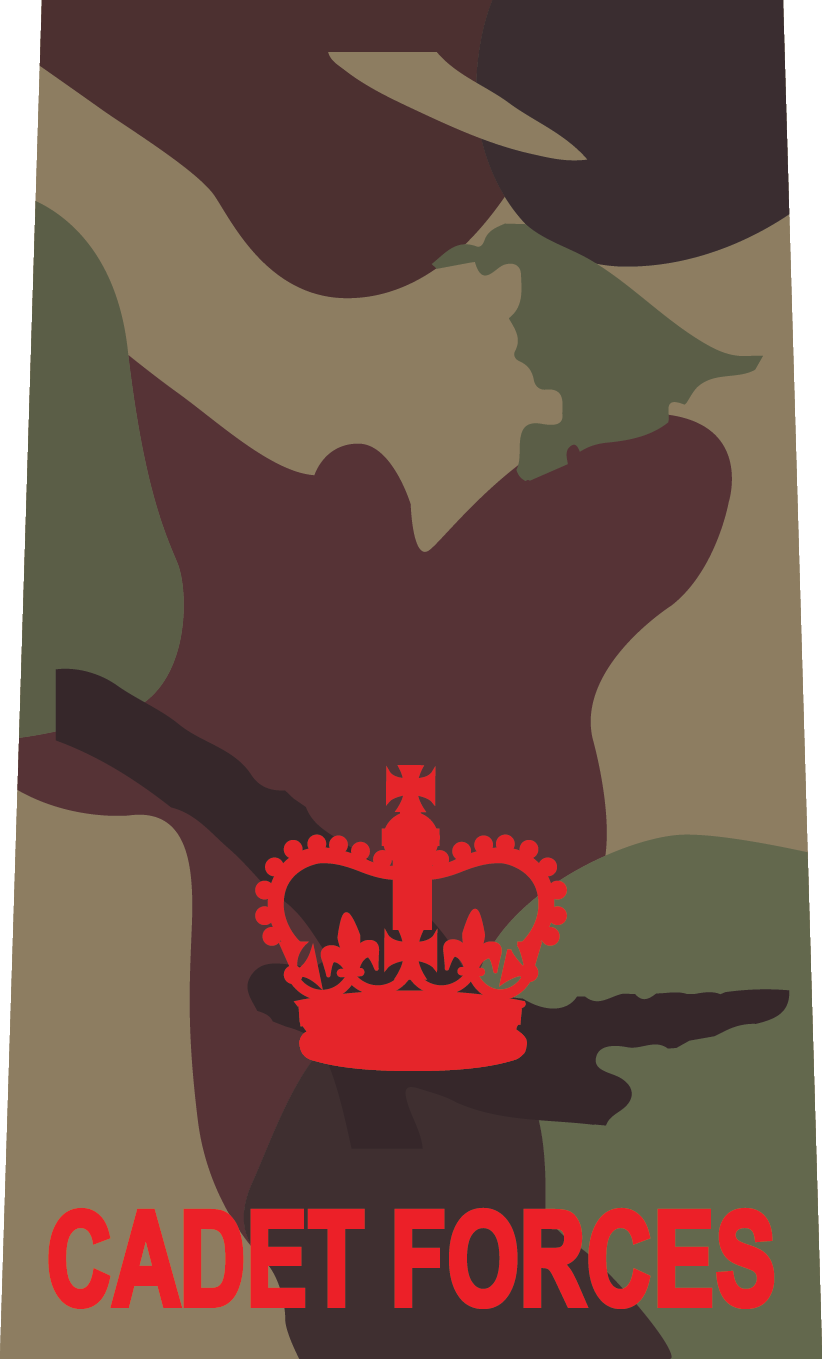
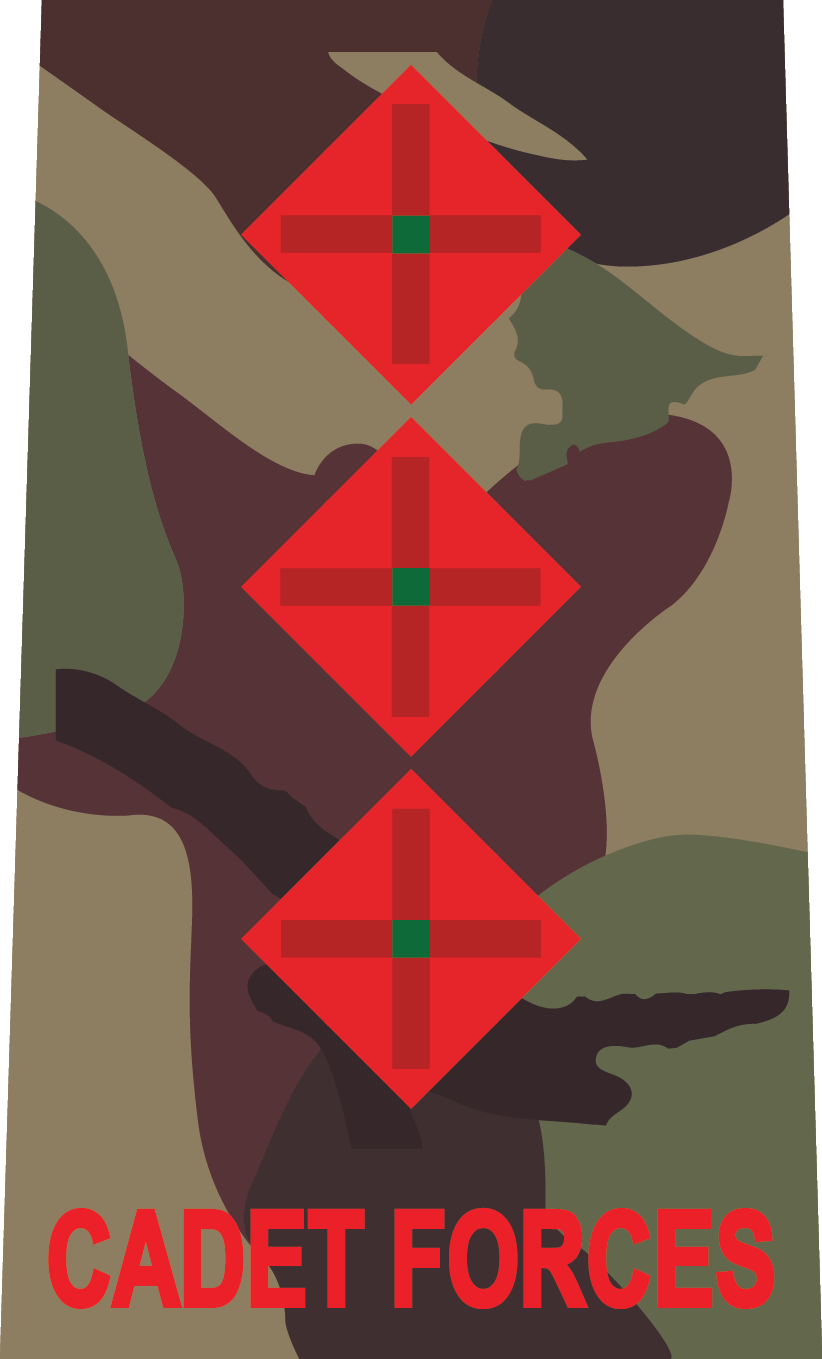
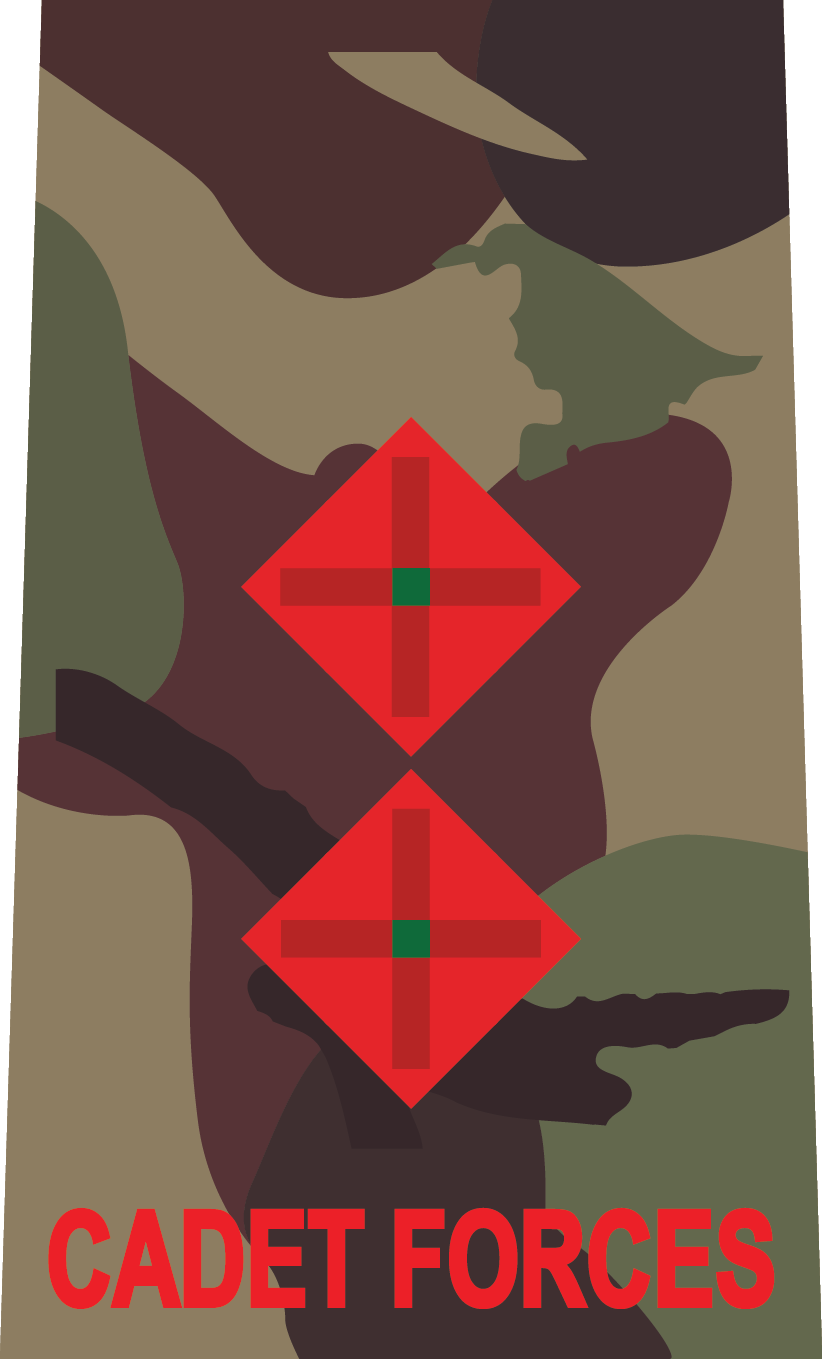
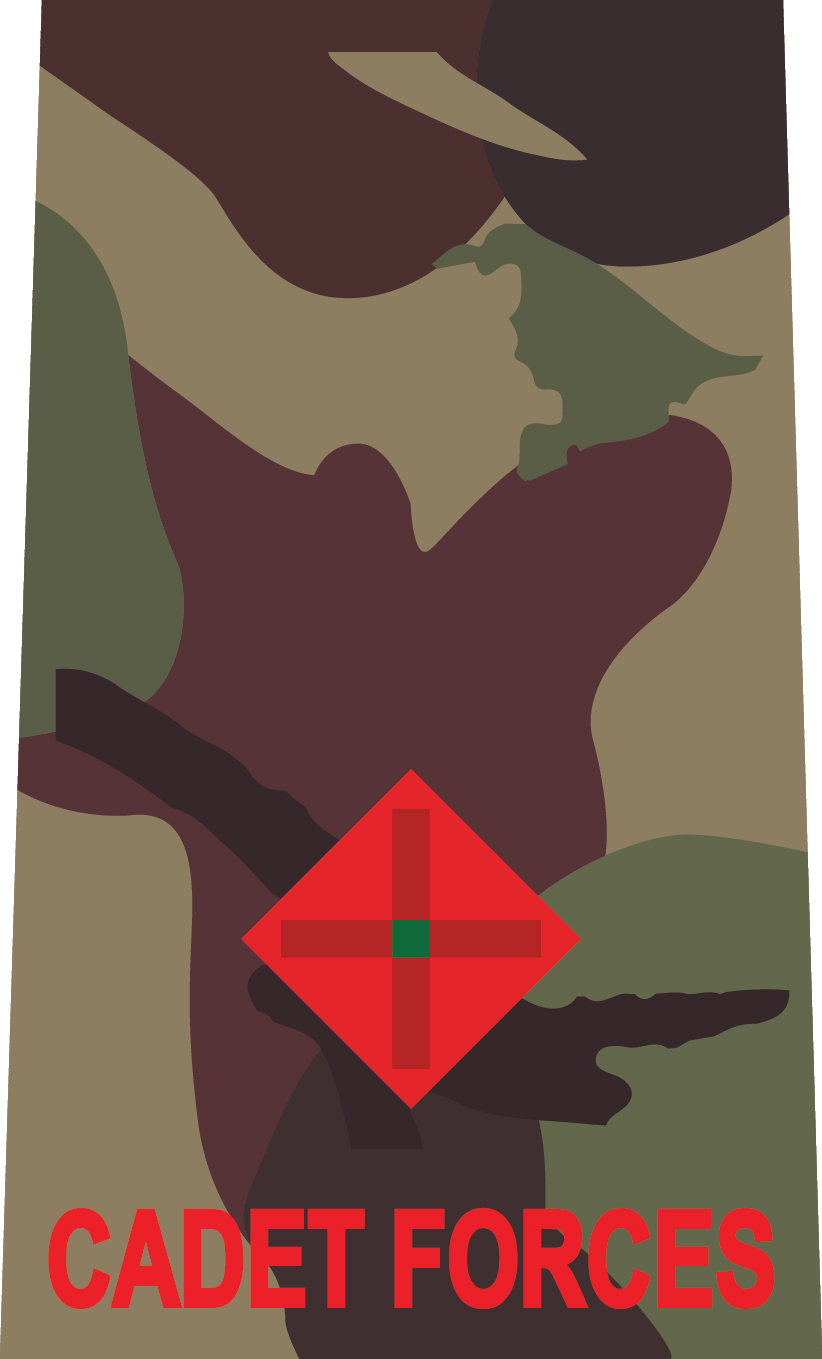
NZCF Officers	OFF 6	OFF 5	OFF 4	OFF 3	OFF 2	OFF 1
Army Cadets
Army Cadets						No Insignia
Army Cadets	Lieutenant; Colonel	Major	Captain	Lieutenant	Second; Lieutenant	Officer cadet
Army Cadets	LTCOL	MAJ	CAPT	LT	2LT	OFFCDT

While New Zealand Cadet Forces Officers hold commissions on behalf the New Zealand Parliament, via the Minister of Defence. They are not entitled to be saluted by New Zealand Defence Force personnel. Due to the rank emblems being identical other than the "New Zealand" and "Cadet Forces" identifier, occasionally Cadet Force Officers are saluted by NZDF personnel, if this happens Cadet Force Officers are encouraged to return the salute to be polite.

New Zealand Cadet Forces Officers and/or Cadets do not hold precedence of rank over NZDF personnel e.g. a Cadet Force Major has no authority to issue orders to a NZDF Second Lieutenant or Non-Commissioned Officers.

== Membership ==
=== Cadet members ===
Interested personnel can join between the ages of 13 and 15 (or if attending the first year of high school) and can stay on without being promoted to the age of 18. Non-Commissioned Officers may serve until their 20th birthday. The exception is the sole school-based unit, as opposed to city or regional based units. Hamilton's Fraser High School Cadet Unit permits all students enrolled at the school to enroll in the unit.

Other than black lace up shoes, all uniform is provided upon enrolment into a unit and completion of a training camp where wearing of the uniform is taught. Bonds are sometimes held to ensure that they are returned.

==== Fees ====
Unit fees are set by each Unit Support Committee annually. Due to fluctuating operating costs, these vary from unit to unit dependent on the type of activities the unit has planned, although fees are to be no more than $200 annually.

=== Adult members ===
==== Adult Cadets ====
In 2017 the New Zealand Cadet Forces updated their Child Protection policy surrounding cadets who are either Non-Commissioned Officers or personnel who are completing cadet level training that are aged 18 and over.

There is a deliberate delineation between an 'Adult' and an 'Officer' as the latter has specific authority to exercise command and control over cadets and other NZCF Officers.

The key difference between a cadet who is an adult and a cadet who is under 18 is that adult cadets and indeed all adults within the New Zealand Cadet Forces are charged with the responsibility of maintaining the safety and welfare of cadets during all NZCF activities. While this doesn't mean that cadets who are classified as adults hold authority over other cadets due to their age, it means that adult cadets are expected to at the very least vocalize to an Officer or Supplementary Staff member when they believe safety and welfare have been compromised.

Cadet Non-Commissioned Officers who are 18 or older are issued a thin white band which is placed onto the rank slide of the individual immediately above the "CADET FORCES" lettering and below the rank emblem.

==== Officers and Supplementary Staff ====
Adult members can serve in two capacities: commissioned officers or Supplementary Staff. Officers are commissioned into the New Zealand Cadet Forces, with the post-nominal letters NZCF, at the rank of second lieutenant, and can be promoted to lieutenant, captain or major after completing the necessary training and service.

In 2014 the organisation introduced a new position of National Support Officer (NSO). This position was designed to place a New Zealand Cadet Force Officer at high level of influence within HQNZCF, which traditionally this position been solely occupied by New Zealand Defence Force Personnel. In 2016 with the adoption of the continental staff system the position was renamed to Assistant Commandant. If he or she is an NZCC officer, as opposed to an ATC or SCC officer, they will hold the rank of Lieutenant Colonel.

Officers are unpaid volunteers, therefore they receive no pay for routine parades and unit activities. They are paid when attending training courses run by the New Zealand Defence Force.

Supplementary Staff or SS for short, are civilians who help train cadets. They do not wear uniform, but they are generally treated similarly to officers by cadets. Members of the NZDF are occasionally attached to cadet units to assist in conducting training. This is normally because they know a cadet/officer in that unit, or if they have a particular interest in cadet forces. They are addressed as "Instructor" or by cadets choice, "Sir" or "Ma'am".

==== Fees ====
Most NZCF Officers do not pay any membership fees, this is typically to balance the time and effort put in by NZCF Officers. While Officers are not encouraged to, a large amount contribute anyway, by way of purchasing stationary and equipment for their unit.

== Activities ==
=== The Duke of Edinburgh's Hillary Award ===
==== Officers and Adults ====
Any Commissioned Officer in the NZCF or Supplementary Staff member that has an active security clearance is eligible to become an award facilitator, allowing cadets within their unit to actively participate in the award and allows any progress towards the award to be signed off. There is no limit to the number of staff members that can be award facilitators, allowing larger units to focus a staff member to each section of the award.

While the award is directed towards young adults and within the NZCF specifically, the cadets and NCOs, Junior Officers and adults under the age of 25 are also eligible to complete any of the awards (although the Gold award would be the most reasonable).

==== Cadet Participation ====
Run in partnership with the Duke of Edinburgh's Hillary Awards the award is a multi year, voluntary, non-competitive programme of practical, cultural and adventurous activities, designed to support the personal and social development of young people aged 14–25, regardless of gender, background or ability. It offers an individual challenge and encourages young people to undertake exciting, constructive, challenging and enjoyable activities in their free time.

Personnel undertaking the award can begin the activity either through their school, a third party provider, or the New Zealand Cadet Forces with more than 9,000 young adults undertaking the programme each year.

Within the frame of the New Zealand Cadet Forces, parade nights and community service events like Anzac Day parades can count towards the service requirement while weekend camps and courses can count towards the skill section of the awards. The Cadet Fieldcraft Activity can also count towards the Adventurous Journey for all three awards. Cadets are also able to retroactively claim work up to 3 months of work they've done before signing up for their first award. For example, if a cadet completed a NZCF promotional course such as the Senior Non-Commissioned Officer Course shortly before signing up for an award, then they would be able to retroactively use the course for their residential project.

Cadets that successfully complete an award are entitled to wear the pin of the highest award they receive on their brassard.

Year	Bronze	Silver	Gold
Badge	Bronze Duke of Edinburgh Badge	Silver Duke of Edinburgh Badge	Gold Duke of Edinburgh Badge
Description	Bronze is the first level of The Award, for your Bronze Award you need to complete 13 hours of two sections and 26 hours of one section.	Silver is the second level of the Award, for Silver you need to complete 26 hours of each section if you have completed bronze and an additional 13 hours if you haven't.	Gold is the highest level of The Award, for Gold you need to complete 12 months of each section if you have completed silver and an additional 26 hours if you haven't. At gold you also need to complete the Residential Project.
Eligibility	You Can start the Bronze award when you turn 14y 6mo.	You can start your silver once you have completed bronze or are 15	You can start gold as soon as you are 16

=== Parade nights ===
Every unit holds parade nights around 2–4 hours long, each week during school terms. Each parade night usually begins and ends with a parade. The starting parade is used to inspect uniforms, and to inform the cadets on the parade night's activities. The final parade to inform the cadets on upcoming events in the unit. Between the parades, the cadets undergo classroom, or practical instruction.

=== Bush Craft ===
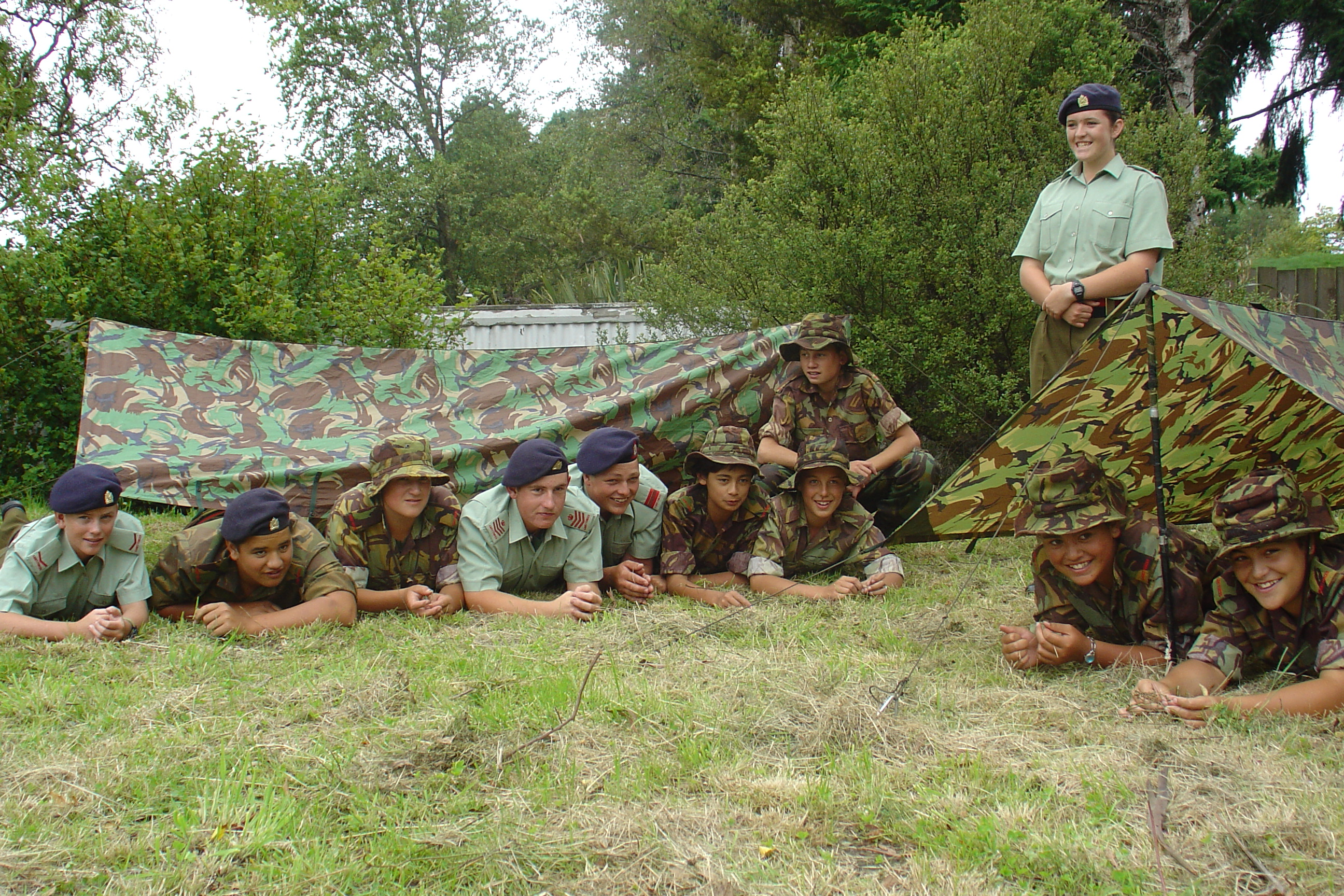
A New Zealand Cadet Corps unit on exercise

All Cadet Corps units conduct classroom training in bush craft and survival skills and hold regular Basic and Advanced bush craft camps in the local area during weekends. The Cadet Fieldcraft activity, renamed and reshaped from the all encompassing 'Fieldcraft course', is a nine-day course that provides Cadets with an enhanced practical experience in field craft to further their outdoor skills training. The course is divided in to two components, the cadet section which offers between 30 and 60 cadets the opportunity to travel around the country to meet and interact with cadets from other squadrons.

Separately the course serves to train Commissioned Officers to be able to lead and manage cadets on day tramps and/or overnight camps on clearly formed tracks in and below the bush line. Officers are taught leadership, risk and crisis management, bush craft skills, and first aid.

The course is held either at RNZAF Dip Flat in the South Island, Waiouru Army base in the North Island, or occasionally Tekapo Army Camp south west of Christchurch.

=== Firearms Training ===
Units conduct regular range training with smallbore rifles. Some units have their own armories' and ranges at their parade hall. Cadets must pass a DFTT (Dry Firing Training Test) before being allowed on the range. Cadets who achieve high marks regularly on the range may be awarded a marksmanship badge to be worn on their brassard. There are numerous competitions run by both the New Zealand Cadet Corps and the greater organisation that promotes competitions between units and individuals.

=== Radio, Cyber, Drones ===
Cadets receive training in the use and maintenance of long range radio equipment, allowing them to maintain communications with other groups over extreme distances. On camps and exercises these skills are tested in a practical environment with cadets being placed in the New Zealand bush at long distances from each other and are expected to be able to co-ordinate together.

=== Public Service ===
Each year the New Zealand Cadet Forces participate in numerous public service events around the country. Anzac day represents the most public and personnel intensive deployment for cadet force personnel, often involving the bulk of the units forces. Cadets will form cenotaph and catafalque parties on behalf of, and in partnership with the New Zealand Defence Force.

Another high-profile public service that the NZCF participate in is the annual Poppy Day drive by the RNRSA, where cadets and RSA members work together to raise funds towards helping New Zealand Veterans and the RNRSA.

=== International Exchanges ===
Each year dozens for personnel from the New Zealand Cadet Corps engage in exchanges with international Cadet Organisations and through delegations to countries through the New Zealand Defence Force. The participants can be any rank and a Commissioned NZCF Officer accompanies each group of cadets overseas, providing opportunities for both adult and youth members.

== Local Training ==
Each Unit holds at least one night per week in order to undertake the Cadet Development Framework. Each unit employs a training officer whose role it is to create and implement a local training programme. The Cadet Development Framework is a four-year programme which provides cadets with the opportunity to develop skills in leadership, aviation knowledge, drill, firearms training, fieldcraft, and more.

The programme provides standardisation for training and expected development within Cadet Units for CDT(E) – CDTWOII(E). Some content is applicable to all three Corps of the NZCF, whilst some is specific to particular Corps.

The content of the Four-Year Training Programme is not designed to fill every period during parade nights in a calendar year, but intentionally leaves scope for Cadet Unit Commanders to add content that will add value to their communities, strengthen Unit identity and provide opportunities for cadets that they may not receive outside of NZCF. However, only completion of the prescribed training will ensure that cadets can continue moving through the development model. Delivery of the content of the Four-Year Training Programme is at Cadet Unit Commander's discretion. In time, further resources to assist in delivery will be developed, including parade night lesson plans, instructor guides and additional resources. Currently available resources should be used in the first instance for delivery of training. Where gaps in knowledge or skills exist, Area Advisors and/or Area Support Officers should be engaged.

The training is split into three different levels off learning that correspond with a cadets progression.

- Lead Self - Years 1-2
- Lead Teams - Year 3+
- Lead Leaders - Year 4+

Junior Cadet Training
Year One Cadets - Basic		Year Two Cadets - Regimental		Year Three Cadets - Corps	
To achieve the Basic badge a cadet must complete the following first year subjects.	Lessons	To achieve the Regimental badge a cadet must complete the following second year subjects.	Lessons	To achieve the Corps badge a cadet must complete the following third year subjects.	Lessons
PMT - Protection Management	1.1-1.10	PMT - Protection Management	2.1-2.3	PMT - Protection Management	3.1-3.2
DRL - Drill	1.1-1.15	DRL - Drill	2.1-2.11	DRL - Drill	3.1-3.7
ETH - Ethics & Safety	1.1-1.5	ETH - Ethics & Safety	2.1-2.2	ETH - Ethics & Safety	3.1-3.2
FAS - Firearms Safety & Marksmanship	1.1-1.6	FAS - Firearms Safety & Marksmanship	2.1-2.7	FAS - Firearms Safety & Marksmanship	3.1-3.3
LDR - Leadership, Communication & Management	1.1-1.2	LDR - Leadership, Communication & Management	2.1-2.2	LDR - Leadership, Communication & Management	3.1-3.4
MED - Health & Medical	1.1-1.2	MED - Health & Medical	2.1-2.3	MED - Health & Medical	3.1-3.3
NAV - Navigation	1.1-1.9	NAV - Navigation	2.1-2.8	NAV - Navigation	3.1-3.2
OPS - Operations, Traditions, History	1.1-1.14	OPS - Operations, Traditions, History	2.1-2.12	OPS - Operations, Traditions, History	3.1-3.7
PHY - Physical & Adventurous Training	1.1-1.8	PHY - Physical & Adventurous Training	2.1-2.4	PHY - Physical & Adventurous Training	3.1-3.4
RCD - Radio, Cyber, Drones	1.1-1.5	RCD - Radio, Cyber, Drones	2.1-2.2	SAL - Systems Approach to Learning	3.1-3.10
FLD - Fieldcraft	1.1-1.5	FLD - Fieldcraft	2.1-2.16	RCD - Radio, Cyber, Drones	3.1-3.2
				FLD - Fieldcraft	3.1-3.3

Senior Cadets / Non Commissioned Officer Training
Year Four Cadets - Advanced		Additional Training (Year 5)	
		No Qualification Badge	
To achieve the Advanced badge a cadet must complete the following fourth year subjects.	Lessons	Suggested additional training subject to unit availability to participate.	Lessons
DRL - Drill	4.1-4.5	DRL - Drill	5.1-5.5
ETH - Ethics & Safety	4.1-4.3		
EXP - Exercise Planning & Risk Management	4.1-4.14		
FAS - Firearms Safety & Marksmanship	4.1-4.3		
LDR - Leadership, Communication & Management	4.1-4.8		
MED - Health & Medical	4.1-4.2		
NAV - Navigation	4.1-4.2		
PHY - Physical & Adventurous Training	4.1-4.6		
OPS - Operations, Traditions, History	4.1-4.5		
SAL - Systems Approach to Learning	4.1-4.5		
FLD - Fieldcraft	4.1-4.2		

== Courses ==
=== Tri-Corps courses ===
- Junior NCO course
- Senior NCO course
- Cadet shooting coaches course
- Drone Operators Course

Also, senior cadets and officers may be selected to staff these courses (except for the shooting coaches course)

=== Officer courses ===
- Officers' Commissioning course
- Instructional technique & management course
- Officers' outdoor leaders course
- Range Conducting Officer course
- NZCF Command course

Also, officers may be selected to staff these courses, except for the range conducting officer course.

== NZCC competitions ==
=== The Chief of Army Cadet Team Challenge (CACTC) ===
The Chief of Army Cadet Team Challenge pushes cadets to their limits in a multi-day competition of endurance, leadership, and fieldcraft. Representing New Zealand, there cadets go head-to-head with the best in Australia, navigating terrain, solving challenges, and proving what teamwork really means. The most recent CACTC was held in 2025, with the NZCF taking out first place.

=== Regional Skills Competition ===
The Regional Skills Competition tests NZCC cadets on a wide range of skills, such as things like GSK & CFK (knowledge of the NZDF and NZCF respectively), rifle shooting, navigation and drill. It is held every year in the Northern, Central and Southern areas. The Northern Area competition is often held at Tamaki Leadership Centre, Central held at RNZAF Base Ohakea and Southern held at Burnham Military Camp. Each competition's winner is then sent on to compete in the National Skills Competition.

=== National Skills Competition ===
The National Skills Competition is more in line with New Zealand Army activities than other competitions, and is intended to provide a challenge comparable to an army exercise. It focuses more on fieldcraft and teamwork than the Regional Skills Competition, and also gives more freedom for the team's leader for decision making. It is often held at the Waiouru Military Camp in the central North Island. Teams who place 1st in the national skills competition are entitled to wear the NZCC National Skills Badge on their brassard.

New Zealand Cadet Corps Skills Competition Winners
Year	Area Competition Winners			National Skills Victors	National Skills Location
Year	Northern	Central	Southern	National Skills Victors	National Skills Location
2025	Hamilton City Cadet Unit	Wellington City Cadet Unit	Nelson Cadet Unit	Hamilton City Cadet Unit	Waiouru Army Camp
2024	Hamilton City Cadet Unit	Wellington City Cadet Unit	Nelson Cadet Unit	Hamilton City Cadet Unit	Waiouru Army Camp
2023	Hamilton City Cadet Unit	City of Upper Hutt Cadet Unit	Ashburton Cadet Unit	Hamilton City Cadet Unit	Waiouru Army Camp
2022	Hamilton City Cadet Unit	City of Upper Hutt Cadet Unit	Nelson Cadet Unit	Nelson Cadet Unit	Waiouru Army Camp
2021	No competition was held due to COVID-19 restrictions.				
2020	Hamilton City Cadet Unit	Feilding Cadet Unit	Ashburton Cadet Unit	Ashburton Cadet Unit	RNZAF Base Auckland
2019	Hamilton City Cadet Unit	Feilding Cadet Unit	Nelson Cadet Unit	Nelson Cadet Unit	Waiouru Army Camp
2018	City of Auckland Cadet Unit	Feilding Cadet Unit	City of Christchurch Cadet Unit	City of Christchurch Cadet Unit	Waiouru Army Camp
2017	Western Bay of Plenty Cadet Unit	Feilding Cadet Unit	Nelson Cadet Unit	Nelson Cadet Unit	Waiouru Army Camp
2016	Mangawhai Cadet Unit	Ruahine Cadet Unit	Ashburton Cadet Unit	Mangawhai Cadet Unit	Waiouru Army Camp
2015	Mangawhai Cadet Unit	City of Upper Hutt Cadet Unit	Ashburton Cadet Unit	Mangawhai Cadet Unit	Unknown
2014	Mangawhai Cadet Unit	City of Upper Hutt Cadet Unit	Nelson Cadet Unit	Mangawhai Cadet Unit	RNZAF Base Ohakea
2013	Mangawhai Cadet Unit	New Plymouth Cadet Unit	Nelson Cadet Unit	Nelson Cadet Unit	Burnham Military Camp
2012	Mangawhai Cadet Unit	Palmerston North Cadet Unit	City of Christchurch Cadet Unit	Mangawhai Cadet Unit	RNZAF Base Ohakea
2011	Mangawhai Cadet Unit	Taupo Cadet Unit	Nelson Cadet Unit	Mangawhai Cadet Unit	Linton Army Camp
2010	Mangawhai Cadet Unit	Unknown	Nelson Cadet Unit	Nelson Cadet Unit	Burnham Military Camp
2009	Mangawhai Cadet Unit	Unknown	Nelson Cadet Unit	Nelson Cadet Unit	Tamaki Leadership Centre
2008	Whangarei District Cadet Unit	New Plymouth Cadet Unit	Dunedin Cadet Unit	Whangarei District Cadet Unit	RNZAF Base Ohakea

=== Shooting Competitions ===
==== Gunson Cup Shooting Trophy ====
Originally awarded to the best first year cadet .22 rifle team in the School Cadet Corps now is presented to the winning team of the New Zealand Cadet Corps smallbore postal shoot.

This competition also represents one of the only opportunity for New Zealand Cadet Corps personnel to earn the NZCF Marksman Badge. In order to be awarded the badge a cadet must, while competing in the Gunson Shooting Competition achieve a score of 80% or more. The other Two Badges are awarded under this competitions ruleset.

There is a common misconception that NZCF personnel can only attain the marksman badge in the Wallingford competition. This is not the case. The NZCF 160 Competitions and Awards Manual states the following.

Attained a score of 80% or more during any of the following shoots:

(1) National Smit, Gunson and Wallingford competitions.

(2) Units practicing for the National Smit, Gunson and Wallingford competitions.

(3) Area and National SCC Regattas, NZCC Skills and ATC Skills competitions.

(4) Competition shoots between Cadet Units.

Note: All shoots are to be conducted under the same rules as the National

Shooting Competitions.

	Competency Badge	First Class Shot Badge	Marksman Badge
Criteria	60% Score (≥60/100)	70% Score (≥70/100)	80% Score (≥80/100)
Badge	NZCC Competency Badge	NZCC First Class Shot Badge	NZCC Marksmanship Badge

==== Fennell Shooting Competition ====
The Ffennell competitions are a group of small-bore rifle matches for the youth of the Commonwealth. New Zealand Cadet Forces units contest the Class B competitions (using issued rifles and sights). The matches are held under the authority of the Commonwealth Postal Competitions Committee (CPCC). All international correspondence on behalf of the CPCC will be handled by the Council for Cadet Rifle Shooting. The aim of these team matches is to encourage the Youth of the Commonwealth to participate in the sport of small-bore target rifle shooting.

Entry is open to any unit or sub-unit of the following:

1. New Zealand Cadet Forces;
2. Junior Servicemen of the New Zealand Defence Forces in one establishment; and
3. Other youth groups approved by the CPCC.

Units may enter one or more teams. Each team shall consist of eight firers. A shooter cannot shoot on more than one team. The team captain may or may not be one of these eight. All members of the team must be under the age of 19 years on the day of firing the match, and be serving members of the same unit or sub-unit.

Each team member will fire two cards, 10 rounds to count being fired at each card, with two rounds fired at each aiming mark. Sighting shots will be completed before the practice begins. The whole team need not complete shooting in one day. Highest Possible Score (HPS) is 200. Team HPS is 1600.

== See also ==
- Cadets (youth program)
