= Harry Brown =

Harry Brown may refer to:

== Arts and entertainment ==
- Harry Joe Brown (1890–1972), American movie producer and theatre and film director
- Harry Brown (actor) (1891–1966), best known for Our Daily Bread (1934), Little Giant (1946), and Shoot to Kill (1947)
- Harry Brown (writer) (1917–1986), American screenwriter and novelist
- Harry Brown (journalist) (1930–2002), Canadian radio and television host

== Politics and law ==
- Harry Brown (Australian politician) (1863–1925), member of the WA Legislative Assembly
- Harry Brown (public servant) (1878–1967), Australian public servant
- Harry Knowlton Brown (1897–1974), politician from Alberta, Canada
- Harry Brown (American politician) (born 1955), member of the North Carolina Senate

== Sports ==
=== Association football (soccer) ===
- Harry Brown (footballer, born 1883) (1883–1934), English inside forward for Bradford Park Avenue, Fulham, Northampton Town, Southampton, Newcastle United and West Bromwich Albion
- Harry Brown (footballer, born 1897) (1897–1958), English centre-forward who played for Queens Park Rangers and Sunderland
- Harry Brown (footballer, born 1907) (1907–1963), Scottish inside forward who played for Chesterfield, Darlington, Hibernian, Plymouth Argyle and Reading
- Harry Brown (footballer, born 1918) (1918–1963), English half-back who played for Hull City and Wolverhampton Wanderers
- Harry Brown (footballer, born 1924) (1924–1982), English goalkeeper who played for Derby County, Exeter City, Notts County, Plymouth Argyle and Queens Park Rangers

=== Other sports ===
- Harry Brown (baseball) (fl. 1910s), American baseball player
- Harry Brown (Australian footballer) (1903–1975), Australian rules footballer for St Kilda
- Harry Brown (basketball) (1948–2021), American-born Canadian basketball player and educator
- Harry Brown (sports person) (born 1994), English wheelchair basketball and wheelchair rugby league player

== Others ==
- Harry A. Brown (1879–1949), American college administrator
- Harry Gunnison Brown (1880–1975), American economist
- Harry Bingham Brown (1883–1954), American pioneer aviator
- Harry W. Brown (VC) (1898–1917), Canadian recipient of the Victoria Cross
- Harry W. Brown (pilot) (1921–1991), American pilot at Pearl Harbor
- Harry Brown (explorer) (1820–1854), Indigenous Australian explorer who accompanied Ludwig Leichhardt

== Other uses ==
- Harry Brown (film), 2009 film

== See also ==
- Harry Browne (1933–2006), American writer and politician
- Harry C. Browne (1878–1954), American actor, musician, and singer
- Harry Browne (cricketer) (1874–1944), English cricketer and British Indian Army officer
- Henry Brown (disambiguation)
- Harold Brown (disambiguation)
- Harrison Brown (disambiguation)
