= Henry Brown =

Henry Brown may refer to:

== Politics and government ==
- Henry Billings Brown (1836–1913), U.S. Supreme Court justice, 1891–1906
- Henry Brown (South Carolina politician) (born 1935), U.S. congressman from South Carolina, 2000–2011
- Henry Brown (Australian politician) (1865–1933), Australian politician
- Henry Brown (New Zealand politician) (1842–1921), New Zealand politician
- Henry Newton Brown Jr. (born 1941), Louisiana judge and former district attorney

== Sports ==
- Henry Brown (field hockey) (1887–1961), Irish Olympic field hockey player
- Henry Brown (footballer) (Henry Oscar Brown, born 2007) English footballer for Grimsby Town FC
- Henry Brown (rugby union) (1910–1965), New Zealand rugby union player, member of the All Blacks
- Brandon Brown (rugby union) (Henry Brandon Brown, born 1994), South African rugby union player
- Henry W. Brown (fl. 1890s), English footballer for FC Barcelona

== Other ==
- Henry Armitt Brown (1844–1878), American author and orator
- Henry Box Brown (1815–1897), American slave who had himself mailed in a box to freedom
- Henry C. Brown (1820–1906), American carpenter, architect and real estate developer in Denver
- Henry Harris Brown (1864–1948), English portrait artist
- Henry Harrison Brown (1840–1918), American spiritualist and early New Thought leader and author
- Henry Kirke Brown (1814–1886), American sculptor
- Henry Newton Brown (1857–1884), American lawman and Old West outlaw
- Henry "Pucho" Brown (1938–2022), leader of Pucho & His Latin Soul Brothers
- Henry Yorke Lyell Brown (1843–1928), Australian geologist
- Henry B. R. Brown (1926–2008), American co-creator of the money market fund
- Henry Brown (inventor), inventor of a box for storing carbon paper
- Henry Phelps Brown (1906–1994), British economist
- Henry T. Brown (1932–2020), African-American chemical engineer
- Henry William Brown (1923–2008), American fighter pilot
- Henry Brown, designer of the Rodley and Scootacar microcars in the 1950s
- Henry Collins Brown (1862–1961), Scottish-born New York historian, lecturer, and author
- Henry L. Brown (1876–1960), African-American physician in Laurel, Mississippi
- Henry Brown (actor), African American actor whose career started in the early 1970s
- Henry Brown (minister, born 1823) (1823–1906), African Methodist Episcopal Church minister and leader of the Underground Railroad
- Henry Brown (minister, born 1848) (1848–1931), Methodist prohibitionist
- Henry Brown (steward) (died 1866), American servant who worked in White House as an assistant steward

== See also ==
- Henry Browne (disambiguation)
- Harry Brown (disambiguation)
