= Abraham Lincoln's hearse =

Abraham Lincoln's hearse (New York)
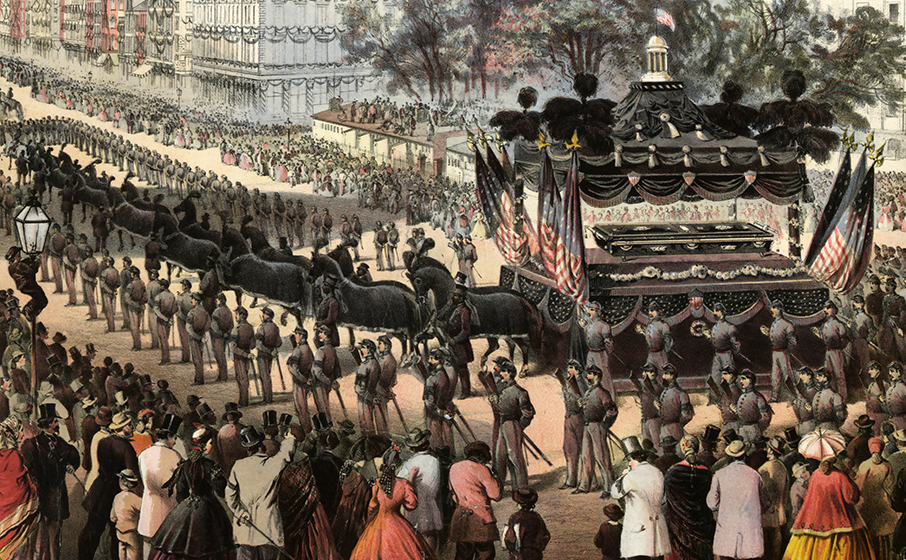
- an 1866 drawing of the hearse

Overview
- Manufacturer: P. Relyea, Practical Undertaker
- Production: 1865
- Designer: Peter Relyea

Abraham Lincoln's hearse (New York) was the purpose-constructed hearse built to carry the body of Abraham Lincoln during a cortège held in New York City on April 25, 1865, shortly after his assassination by John Wilkes Booth. It has been described as the most elaborate of the many hearses used to transport Lincoln's body during the two-week funeral tour which preceded his burial in Springfield, Illinois.

== Design and history ==
Peter Relyea (1817–1896) was appointed to organize the New York portion of Lincoln's death tour and construct a hearse for the parade through Manhattan. It was built at the intersection of East Broadway and Grant Street over a period of three days and in full view of the public. According to reports, large crowds gathered to marvel at the construction.

The hearse was described as "immense", being 14 feet (4.3 m) long and 7 feet (2.1 m) wide. Its exterior was entirely black, except for glass walls, and was topped by black plumes. Its interior was lined in white satin and black velvet, and above the catafalque on which the coffin was to be set hung a sculptured golden eagle. The platform itself had a ground clearance of 5 feet (1.5 m) and was covered by a 15-foot-tall (4.6 m) canopy. At each of the four corners of the vehicle were three United States flags.

On the day it was brought into operation, the hearse was drawn by a team of sixteen horses, caparisoned in black, and each tended by a groom dressed in matching sable.

== Reception ==
On April 25, 1865, the hearse, carrying Lincoln's body, was drawn through the streets of Manhattan en route to New York City Hall. It was accompanied by an "astounding" escort of 160,000 people, including soldiers, sailors, Marines, and dignitaries, in a lumbering and somber procession observed by half-a-million spectators. According to one source, upon coming into view, the hearse "just about paralyzed all beholders with its magnificence".

In his book Lincoln's Body: A Cultural History, University of Southern California history professor Richard Wightman Fox observed that "in its intricate symbolism, this hearse outdid the others that carried Lincoln's body along the funeral route".

== See also ==
- Lincoln catafalque
- Old Bob – caparisoned horse used in Lincoln's Springfield, Illinois funeral cortège
