= Harold Brown =

Harold Brown may refer to:

- Harold Brown (Tuskegee Airman) (1924–2023), U.S. Air Force officer and Tuskegee Airmen fighter pilot, World War II prisoner of war (POW)
- Harry Brown (journalist) (Harold Andrew Brown, 1930–2002), Canadian radio and television host
- Harold K. Brown (1934–2026), San Diego civil rights activist
- Harold L. Brown (born 1946), Pennsylvania politician
- Harold P. Brown (1857–1932), American inventor, anti-alternating current activist
- Harold Brown (basketball) (1923–1980), American basketball player
- Harold Brown (secretary of defense) (1927–2019), American physicist, U.S. Secretary of Defense
- Harold Ray Brown (born 1946), American drummer, member of the 1970s band War
- Harold Brown (athlete) (1917–2002), Canadian athlete
- Harold Brown (footballer) (1878–1940), Australian rules footballer for Essendon and St Kilda
- Harold Brown (gymnast) (1904–1986), British Olympic gymnast
- Harold Brown (Rhode Island financier) (1863–1900), American financier, philanthropist, and prominent member of New York society
- Harold Brown (ice hockey) (1920–1997), Canadian ice hockey right winger
- Harold Brown (film preservationist) (1919–2008), British pioneer in the science of film preservation
- Harold Brown (Royal Navy officer) (1878–1968), English engineer with the Royal Navy
- Harold Brown, main character in Harry Brown
- J. Harold Brown (1902–1982), American composer
- Harold O. J. Brown (1933–2007), American theologian, professor, activist, and author
- Harold Vivian Marsh Brown (c. 1907–1992), Australian architect

== See also ==
- Harry Brown (disambiguation)
- Harold Browne (1811–1891), British bishop
- Harry Browne (1933–2006), American writer, politician, investment analyst, and Libertarian Party Presidential nominee
