= Washington's Tomb (United States Capitol) =

Empty burial chamber

Coordinates: 38.8899°N 77.009°W

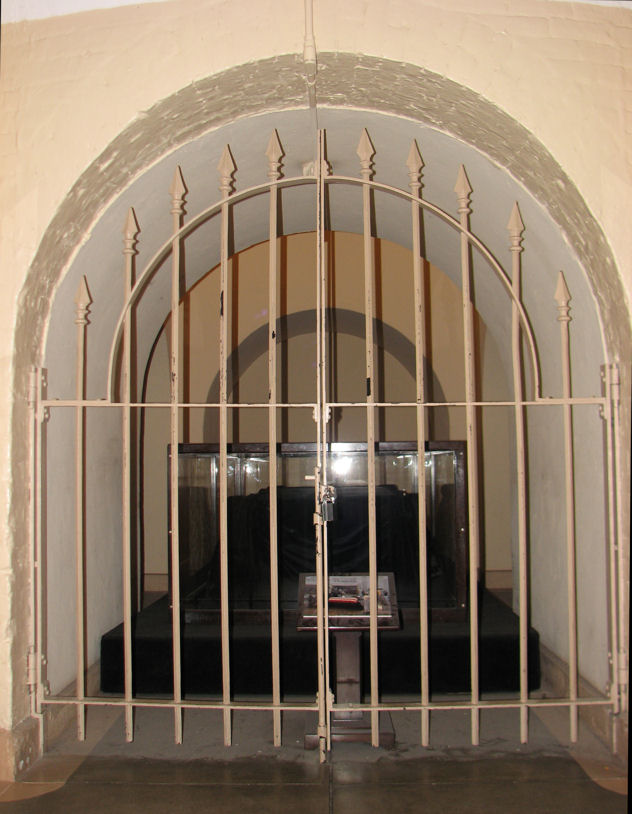
Washington's Tomb displaying the Lincoln catafalque, 2007

Washington's Tomb is an empty burial chamber two stories directly below the rotunda of the United States Capitol building in Washington, D.C. It was included in the original design of the building by William Thornton and intended to entomb the body of George Washington, who was instead buried at Mount Vernon. The original design of the rotunda, and the Crypt beneath it, included a central glass floor allowing the public to view Washington's Tomb two floors below, but this was never implemented.

When Washington died on December 14, 1799, the Capitol was still under construction and nearing completion of its north wing for the Senate chamber only in its first phase. The federal government was still then located further north in Philadelphia, Pennsylvania, and would not be moving until about November 1800 and following March 1801, for the opening of the new congressional term and presidential inauguration. Both houses of Congress later passed a resolution calling for the revered Washington to be entombed as originally planned by the architects in the Capitol upon its eventual construction completion and dedication. His wife, Martha Washington (1731-1802), agreed to the plan despite the presence in her husband's last will and testament, of a provision he wrote that he was to be buried at Mount Vernon. However, the original congressional resolution was never carried out due to disputes over the specific design and cost of the underground tomb and the body was placed in a temporary tomb at his longtime beloved home at Mount Vernon, near the estate house, overlooking the Potomac River in Virginia (southeast of Washington, D.C.). Congress again attempted to resolve these issues later in 1800, (when the Congress and President first moved from Philadelphia to the new Washington city), then subsequently in 1816, 1824, and 1829, when the then Architect of the Capitol finally prepared plans for the tomb in anticipation of the approaching centennial observances of Washington's birth in 1832.

Congress renewed its call to transfer the body to the Capitol in 1830, after an attempt to steal Washington's head in which the original temporary Mount Vernon tomb was vandalized and several of Washington's relatives' corpses desecrated in 1830. The then current owner of the property, his descendant John Washington, decided to build a new, more secure tomb on the site instead.

The Lincoln catafalque, first used in April 1865 to support the casket of President Abraham Lincoln and then used for other ceremonial state funerals at the Capitol and White House in the years since, was previously stored and exhibited in the proposed Washington's Tomb below the central Rotunda. It was later moved and is kept, at present, in a specially constructed display area in the Exhibition Hall of the underground Capitol Visitor Center since it opened in December 2008, beneath the East Front grounds of the Capitol.

== See also ==
- United States Capitol crypt
- List of burial places of presidents and vice presidents of the United States
