= Attempted theft of George Washington's skull =

Attempted criminal offense

Coordinates: 38.7068°N 77.0887°W

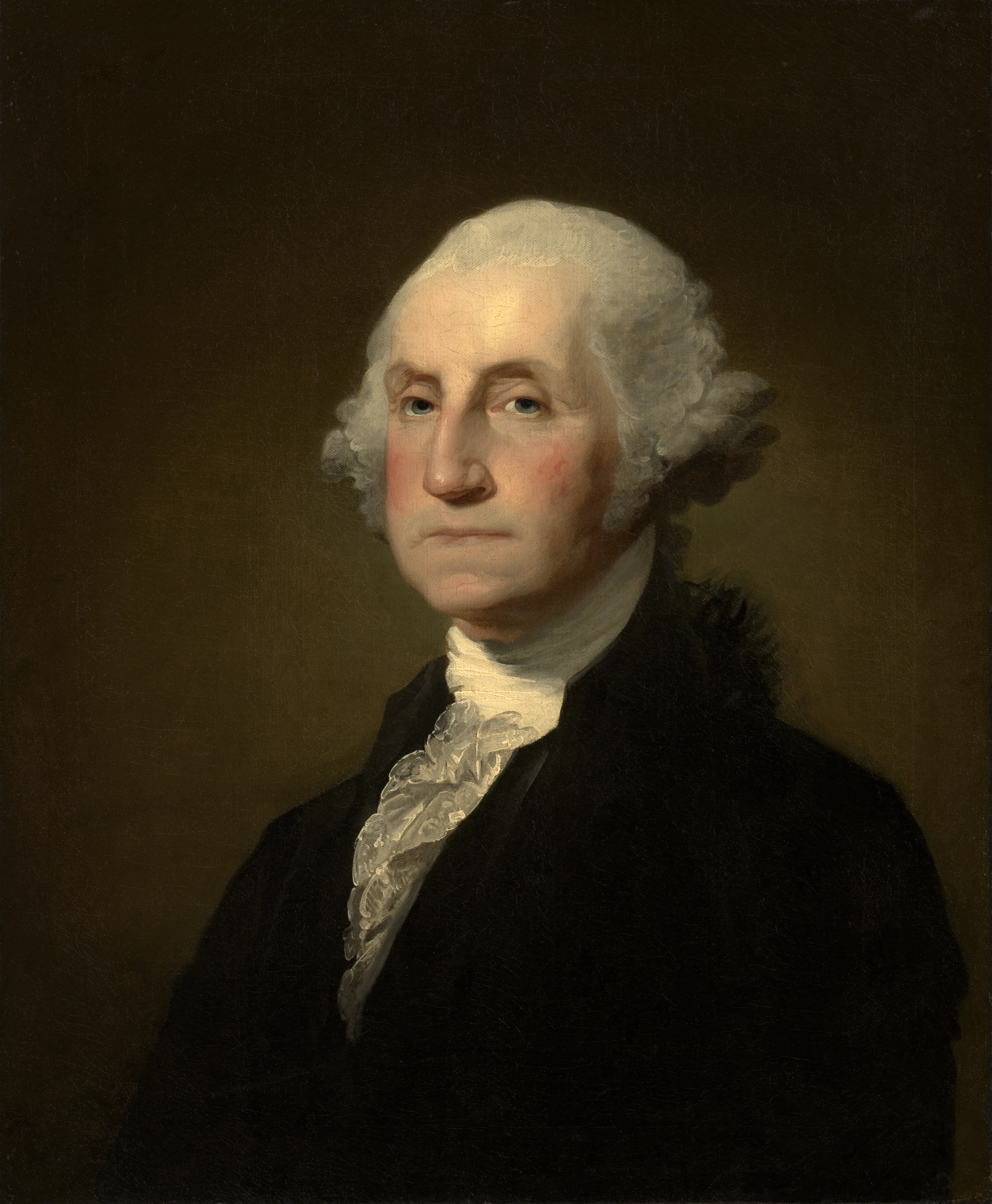
George Washington, painted by Gilbert Stuart, 1797

In 1830, an attempt was made to steal the skull from the remains of American president George Washington, which resided in a tomb at Mount Vernon. Instead, the thief mistakenly removed the skull from the remains of one of Judge Bushrod Washington's in-laws. The desecration of the burial site prompted a new, more secure, burial vault to be constructed.

== Background ==
Following George Washington's death in 1799, the United States government announced its intent to transfer his remains to the United States Capitol where preparations were underway to construct a crypt in its basement connecting to a glass-enclosed vault which would entomb his body. Despite specifications in Washington's will that he be interred at his Mount Vernon estate, Martha Washington consented to have her husband's body transferred to the capital city. Nonetheless, arguments concerning the details of the committal arrangements severely delayed the transfer of Washington's remains which were, in the interim, placed in a separate crypt on the Mount Vernon estate.

Over the next 30 years, the Mount Vernon crypt fell into increasing disrepair. The situation was exacerbated by a large number of pilgrims who traveled to Washington's grave to retrieve artifacts, generally including foliage. This resulted in trees and other flora around the tomb being stripped bare. The Russian ambassador to the United States even removed an entire branch from a tree growing next to the tomb for later presentation to Tsar Alexander I.

== Theft ==
In 1830, John Augustine Washington II, then proprietor of Mount Vernon, fired one of the estate's gardeners, whose name is now unknown. Out of revenge, the unemployed gardener broke into the crypt with the intent of stealing George Washington's skull. However, the gardener inadvertently absconded with the skull of one of the Blackburns, who were in-laws of George Washington's nephew, Judge Bushrod Washington. The extremely dilapidated state of the tomb reportedly contributed to the gardener's confusion; some twenty members of the Washington family and their relatives had been placed in the crypt but many of their coffins had since rotted through, meaning human skeletons lay littered on the ground. The bodies of George and Martha Washington, however, had been encased in lead before their committal, so were "spared this indignity".

== Aftermath ==
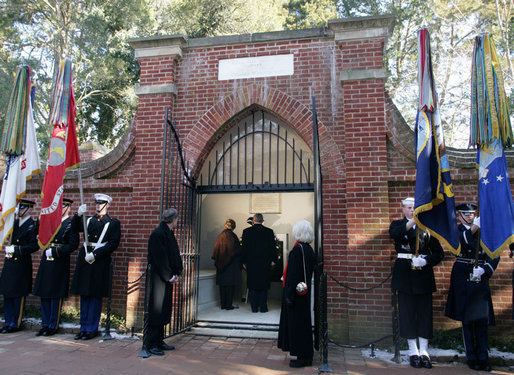
The current, 1831, crypt at Mount Vernon pictured in 2007

As a result of the attempted theft, Congress reissued its call to take possession of Washington's body, but John Washington refused, saying he could not disturb Washington's "perfect tranquility". Instead, he ordered the construction of a new crypt near the existing one. The bodies of George and Martha Washington were moved to the new facility in 1831, which drew criticism from some, including the Earl of Carlisle who, after visiting it in 1841, observed that "the tomb of that most illustrious of mortals, is placed under a glaring red building, somewhat between a coach-house and a cage".

In 1837, a new and more elaborate sarcophagus was constructed out of Pennsylvania marble into which the original lead interior coffin was transferred. At that time, the coffin was unsealed for the first and last time so John Washington could view his uncle's body (there are conflicting theories about whether the viewing was done to ensure no one else had attempted to steal the head or if it was simply inspired by morbid curiosity). According to a report published in Harper's New Monthly Magazine, the corpse "appeared to have suffered little from the effects of time" and was notable for its "large dimensions" (in life, Washington reportedly stood more than 6 ft (1.83 m) tall, unusually large for the eighteenth century, and had a "massive" head with "tremendously" large hands and size 13 feet).

=== Theft of hair ===
A claim has been made that locks of hair were removed from the body of George Washington during the 1837 unsealing, though attempts to auction them in recent years have proved unsuccessful and doubts about their authenticity have been raised.

In an 1835 book about the life and times of the Marquis de Lafayette, Jules Germain Cloquet reports that Lafayette – on his visit to the United States in 1824 – received a ring from one of George Washington's step-grandchildren into which was enclosed George and Martha Washington's hair. According to Cloquet, the ring was given with the wish that it be descended to successive generations of the Marquis' family.

== See also ==
- List of George Washington articles
