= Catafalque =

Raised bier to display a body or casket

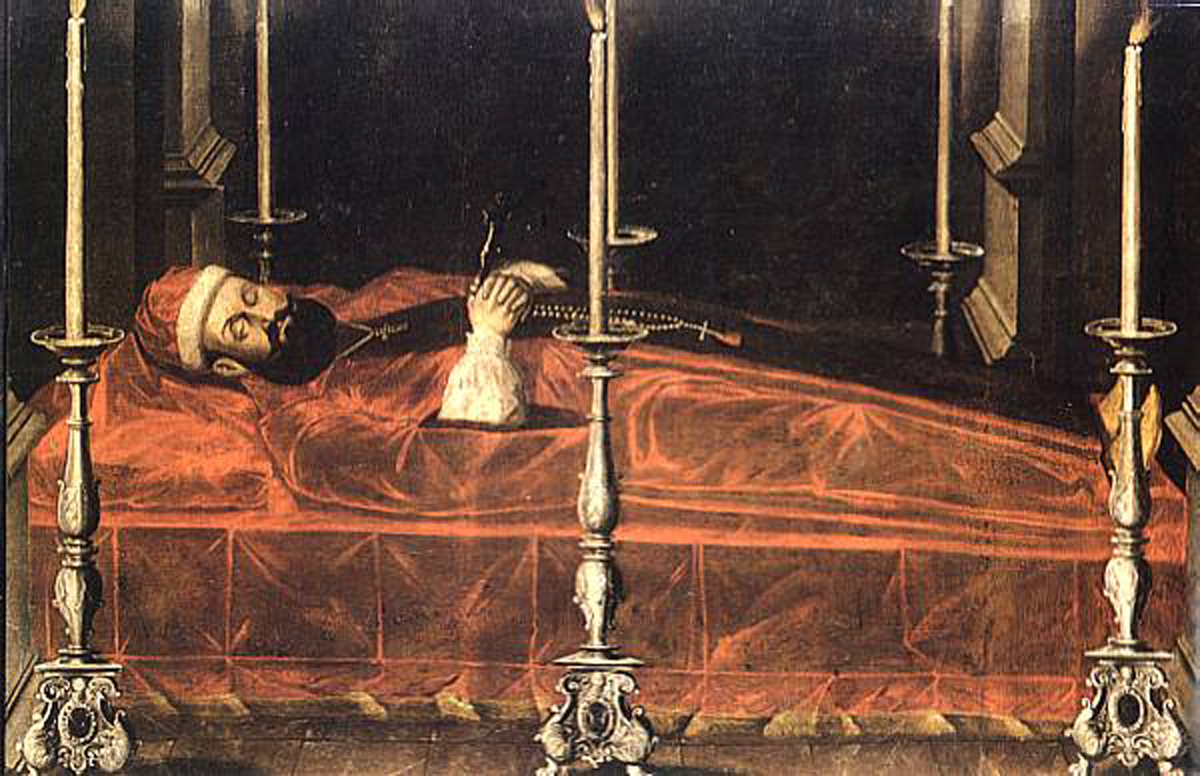
Catafalque of nobleman Krzysztof Opaliński, 17th century Poland

A catafalque is a raised bier, box, or similar platform, often movable, that is used to support the casket, coffin, or body of a dead person during a Christian funeral or memorial service. Following a Roman Catholic Requiem Mass, a catafalque may be used to stand in place of the body at the absolution of the dead or used during Masses of the Dead and All Souls' Day.

== Etymology ==
According to Peter Stanford the term originates from the Italian catafalco, which means scaffolding. However, the Oxford English Dictionary says the word is "[o]f unknown derivation; even the original form is uncertain; French pointing to -fald- or -falt-, Italian to -falc-, Spanish to -fals." An elaborate and highly decorated roofed surround for a catafalque, common for grand funerals of the Baroque era, may be called a castrum doloris.

== Papal catafalques ==
Large processions have followed the catafalques of popes. The households of the cardinals carried the catafalque of Pope Sixtus V in 1590. The bier, decorated with gold cloth, was followed by "confraternities, religious orders, students of seminaries and colleges, orphans and mendicants". In 1963, a million people filed past the catafalque of Pope John XXIII, which had been carried in procession to St. Peter's Basilica in Rome. In Catholic Liturgy, the catafalque is either an empty casket or a wooden form made to look like a casket that is covered by the black pall and surrounded by six unbleached (orange) candles (when they are available); it is a symbolic representation of the deceased or a monument erected to represent the faithful departed. When it is present, the priest sings the absolution for the deceased as if the body was present.

== Notable catafalques ==
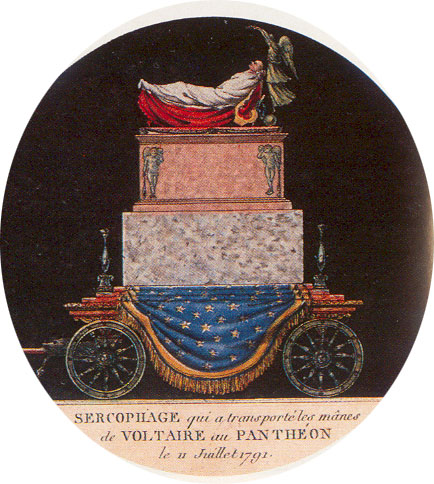
Voltaire's catafalque

Other than religious leaders such as popes, famous people have lain in state or been carried in procession to their burial place on a catafalque.

=== Michelangelo ===
The most notable Italian catafalque was the one designed for Michelangelo by his fellow artists in 1564.

=== Voltaire ===
Thirteen years after his death, the remains of Voltaire were transferred on a catafalque to the Panthéon in Paris, a building dedicated to the great men of the French nation. It bore the inscription: "Poet, philosopher, historian, he made a great step forward in the human spirit. He prepared us to become free."

=== Abraham Lincoln ===
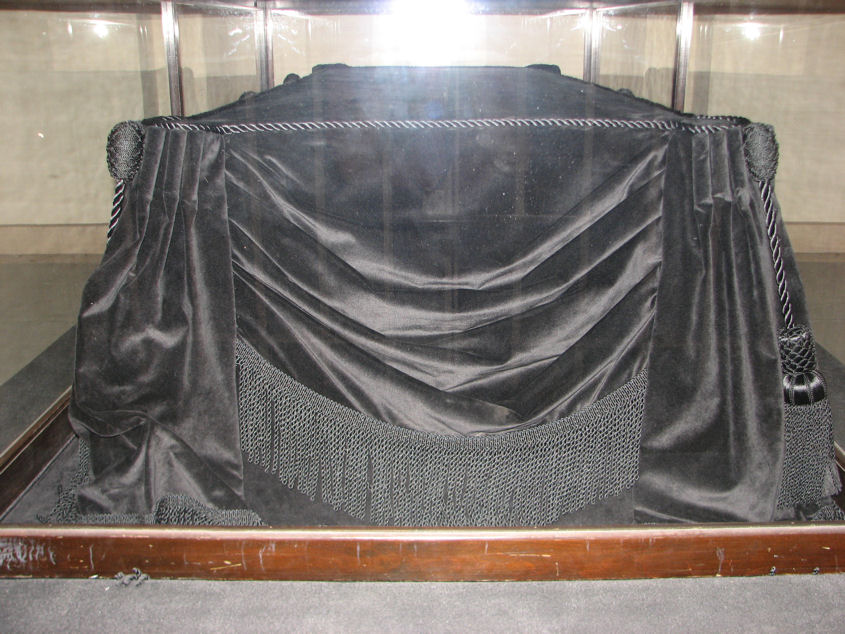
The Lincoln catafalque in the United States Capitol

The Lincoln catafalque, first used for United States President Abraham Lincoln's funeral in 1865, has been used for all those who have lain in state in the Capitol Rotunda since Lincoln's death, the most recent of which were Capitol Police Officer Billy Evans on April 13, 2021, and U.S. Senator Bob Dole on December 9, 2021. It has recently been used at the state funeral for Jimmy Carter in the Capitol rotunda in January 2025. It was later moved to the portico of the Court for public viewing. When not in use, the catafalque is kept on display in the Exhibition Hall at the United States Capitol Visitor Center. Commentators noted that the structure of the original pine timbers and boards has been reinforced, albeit being left "original".

== See also ==
- Caisson
- Catafalque party
