= Henry Browne =

Henry Browne may refer to:

- Henry Browne, Farmer, a 1942 film about African-American contributions to the American home front in World War II
- Henry Browne (scholar) (1804–1875), English classical and biblical scholar
- Henry Gore-Browne (1830–1912), Irish recipient of the Victoria Cross
- Henry Cave-Browne-Cave (1887–1965), Royal Naval Air Service and Royal Air Force officer
- Henry Browne, 5th Marquess of Sligo (1831–1913), Irish peer
- Henry Browne (priest) (1780–1858), Anglican priest

== See also ==
- Henry Browne Blackwell (1825–1909), American social reformer
- Henry Browne Hayes (1762–1832), Irish-born convict
- John Henry Browne (born 1946), American criminal defense attorney
- Henry Brown (disambiguation)
- Harry Browne (1933–2006), American writer, politician, and investment advisor
