= Harrison Brown (disambiguation) =

Harrison Brown (1917–1986) was an American scientist.

Harrison Brown may also refer to:

- Harrison Browne (born 1993), Canadian transgender ice hockey player
- Harrison Bird Brown (1831–1915), American painter

== See also ==
- Harry Brown (disambiguation)
