= Catafalque party =

Military honour guard

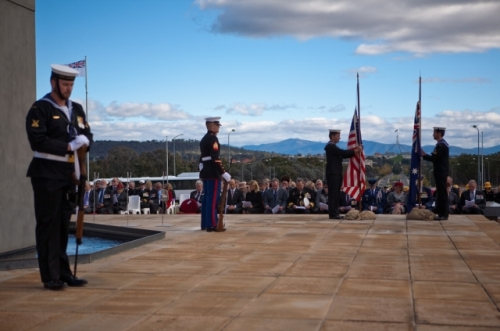
A Catafalque party

A catafalque party is a guard, usually of four people, that stands watch over the coffin and catafalque of a distinguished person or over a significant monument.

In Australia, a catafalque party acts as sentries for the memorial or cenotaph during annual Anzac Day commemorations.
