= Old Bob =

Driving horse of Abraham Lincoln

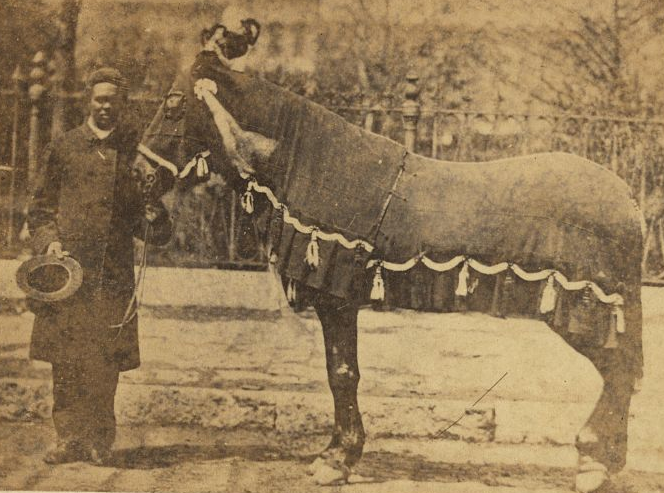
- Old Bob caparisoned in a mourning blanket at Abraham Lincoln's funeral
- Other name: Old Robin (unconfirmed)
- Species: Equus ferus
- Sex: Male
- Born: c. 1849
- Occupation: Driving horse
- Appearance: Bay

Old Bob or Old Robin (c. 1849 – unknown) was a driving horse used by Abraham Lincoln during the period prior to his presidency of the United States. He later participated in Lincoln's funeral. Old Bob's exact fate and date of death are unknown; he was sold to drayman John Flynn by Lincoln in 1860.

== Name ==
There is confusion about whether the name of the horse was "Old Bob" or "Old Robin", though "Old Bob" is the name most widely used. It is believed Lincoln named the horse "Old Bob" to differentiate the animal from his son, Robert Lincoln ("young Bob").

== Early life ==
Lincoln acquired Old Bob while practicing law in Springfield, Illinois, and used the animal as a carriage horse when traveling on his circuit in areas unconnected by the railroad. Old Bob replaced Lincoln's other horse, Old Buck, who had become too old for regular use. He was stabled in a barn behind the Lincoln home with another Lincoln-owned horse, Old Tom.

Following his 1860 election as President of the United States, and prior to his subsequent move to Washington, D.C., Lincoln sold Old Bob to John Flynn, a Springfield drayman.

By 1865 Old Bob had been put to pasture, however, on April 4 of that year he was brought out of retirement to participate in a parade in Springfield celebrating the capitulation of the Confederate States capital city of Richmond, Virginia. He was coated in a red, white and blue blanket for the occasion.

== Lincoln funeral and later life ==
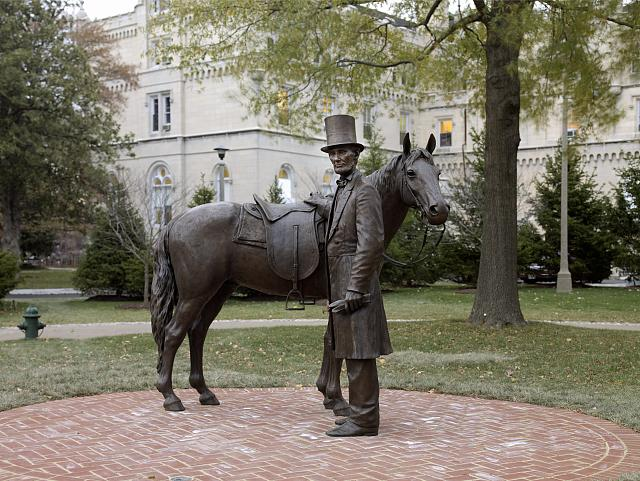
A statue of Abraham Lincoln with a horse modeled on Old Bob at President Lincoln's Cottage at the Soldiers' Home

Following the assassination of Abraham Lincoln, Old Bob was again brought out of retirement. During the cortège preceding the funeral in Springfield, Old Bob was caparisoned in a black mourning blanket trimmed with silver fringe and tassels. Henry Brown, an African Methodist Episcopal minister and friend of the Lincoln family, led Old Bob, whose spot in the procession was immediately behind the hearse and in front of the carriage carrying Robert Todd Lincoln. It has been said that Robert Lincoln and Old Bob were the only members of Lincoln's family present at his funeral. (Note: Mary Lincoln became hysterical following the assassination. Unable to participate in the funeral observances, she remained cloistered at the White House with Tad Lincoln throughout.)

After the funeral, it is believed there were several attempts to acquire the horse by showmen who wished to put it on exhibition, but that John Flynn declined offers to sell the animal. Old Bob's ultimate fate is unknown.

== Legacy ==
A statue by Ivan Schwartz, Stuart Williamson and Jiwoong Cheh depicting Lincoln with a horse modeled on Old Bob was installed in 2008 at President Lincoln's Cottage at the Soldiers' Home in Washington, D.C. The sculptors studied a photograph of Old Bob in designing the statue, which depicts an American Standardbred saddled for riding.

During the 2015 sesquicentennial observances of Lincoln's death, the cortège was restaged in Springfield. Glory, a horse used by Daniel Day-Lewis in the 2012 film Lincoln, was used to represent Old Bob. The same year, Bunker Hill Publishing published a children's book by Trudy Krisher, An Affectionate Farewell: The Story of Old Abe and Old Bob.

== See also ==
- Abraham Lincoln's hearse
- Black Jack – a U.S. Army horse caparisoned for the state funerals of John F. Kennedy, Herbert Hoover, and Lyndon Johnson
- Riderless horse
- List of historical horses
