= Harry Brown (footballer, born 1918) =

English footballer (1918–1963)

Personal information
- Full name: Henry Stanford Brown
- Date of birth: 23 May 1918
- Place of birth: Workington, England
- Date of death: 1963 (aged 44–45)
- Position: Half back

Senior career*
Years	Team	Apps	(Gls)
- Workington
1938–1939	Wolverhampton Wanderers	2	(0)
1939–1947	Hull City	22	(0)
- * Club domestic league appearances and goals

Henry Stanford Brown (23 May 1918 – 1963) was an English footballer who played as a half back for various clubs in the 1930s and 1940s, including Wolverhampton Wanderers and Hull City.

== Career ==
He joined Wolverhampton Wanderers in 1938 from Workington, making his debut on 22 April 1939 in a goalless draw at Bolton Wanderers. He played the following game at Leicester City, his only two appearances for the club, before joining Hull City.

After the disruption to league football caused by World War II, he was able to make his Football League debut for Hull in 1946.

In 1959 he became manager of Bridlington Town AFC on their entry to the Yorkshire League, winning promotion in their first season. He was still manager at the time of his death in a road accident.
