= United States Capitol crypt =

United States Capitol room

Coordinates: 38°53′24″N 77°00′32″W

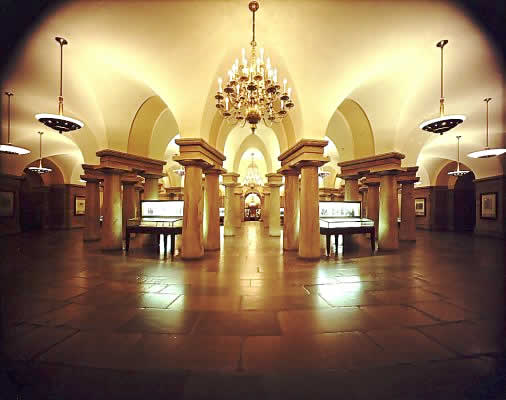
The United States Capitol crypt, image taken looking east

The United States Capitol crypt is the large circular room filled with forty neoclassical Doric columns directly beneath the United States Capitol rotunda. It was built originally to support the rotunda as well as offer an entrance to Washington's Tomb. It currently serves as a museum and a repository for thirteen statues of the National Statuary Hall Collection.

== Origin and construction ==
The crypt originated with the initial designs drawn up for the United States Capitol by William Thornton, which called for a rotunda to be placed between the two wings of the building. The room beneath the rotunda was therefore required to support the large space above it. However, construction did not begin on the central part of the Capitol, where the rotunda and the room beneath it were located, until after the War of 1812.

Construction on the Capitol itself began in 1793, when the first American president, George Washington, laid down the cornerstone to the north wing of the building. Upon the death of Washington in 1799, the designers of the Capitol went to Martha Washington and requested permission to build a tomb for her husband in the Capitol. She acquiesced to this request and plans were made to construct the tomb underneath the floor that supported the rotunda. This area was designated the crypt, as it would serve as the entry to the tomb.

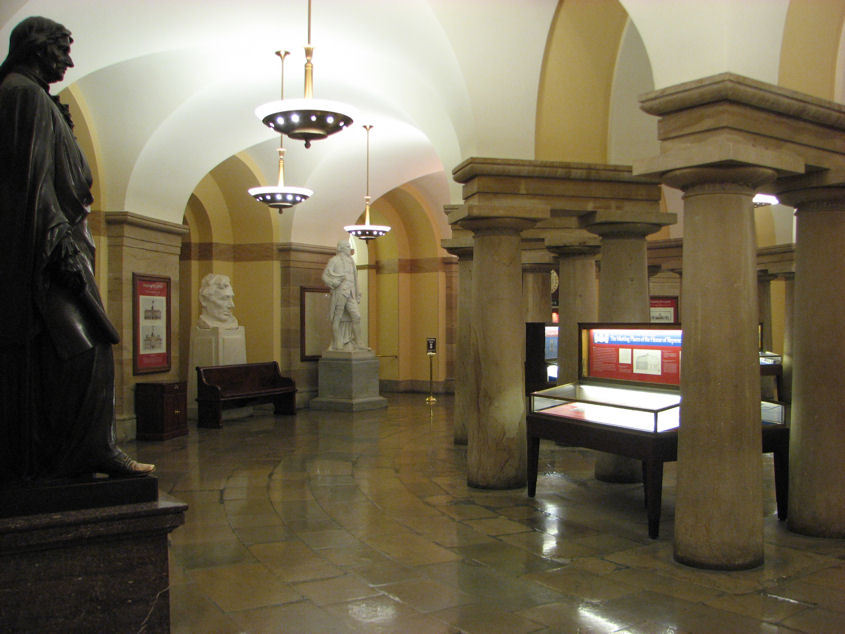
The crypt in 2007, looking southwest from south entrance.

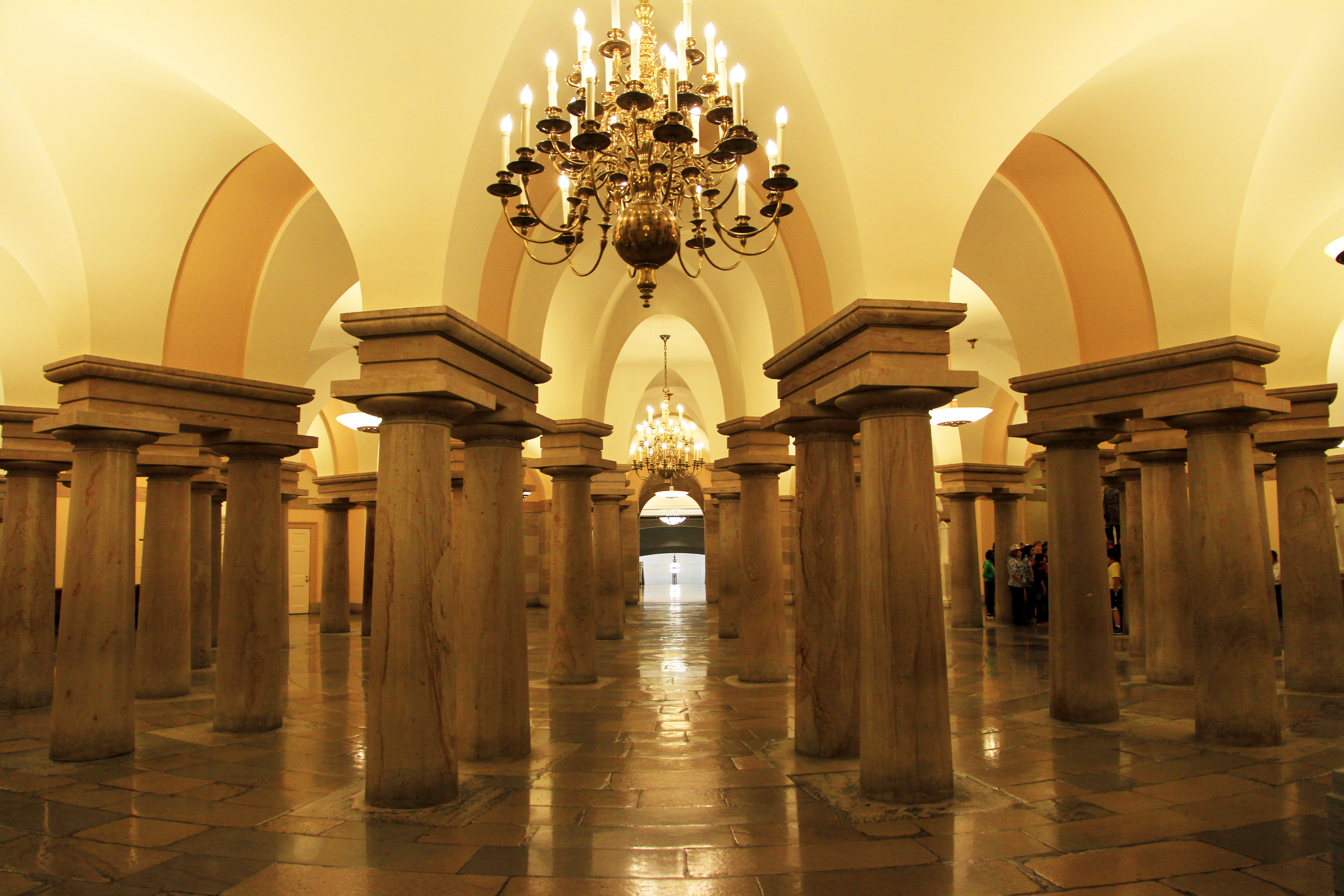
Capitol crypt

Delays wracked the construction efforts of the Capitol's builders, notably the interruption by the War of 1812, when all construction came to a halt. In August 1814, the British captured the city of Washington and set fire to the Capitol, nearly destroying the entire building. Thus, when construction recommenced after the war ended in 1815, it was initially to rebuild what had been lost to the fire.

The central section of the Capitol comprising the rotunda and the crypt was not completed until 1827 under the oversight of Architect of the Capitol Charles Bulfinch. However, plans to re-inter Washington in the Capitol fell apart when attempts were made to retrieve his body from Mount Vernon, the President's home, due to restrictions of Washington's will and refusal of the plantation's then owner, John Washington.

A marble compass was set into the floor of the chamber to mark the point where the four quadrants of the District of Columbia meet.

== Usage ==
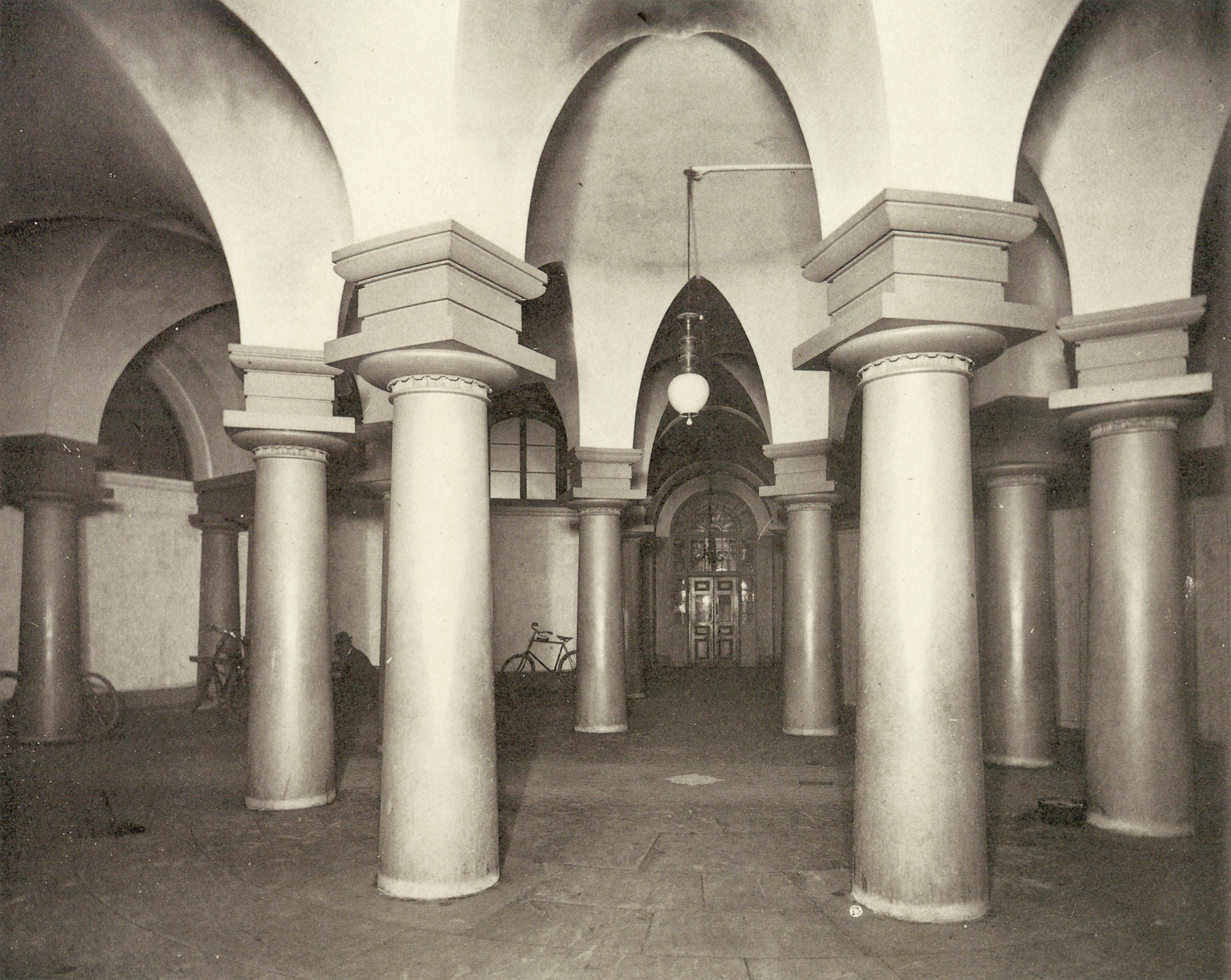
Capitol crypt, c.1900.

Circa 1900, the Capitol crypt was used informally for bicycle parking.

The crypt serves as the main thoroughfare of the ground floor of the Capitol and is a stop for all Capitol Tours provided through the Capitol Visitor Center. The crypt also contains the Magna Carta Case, a gold case which held one of the copies of the Magna Carta when it was on loan to the United States for the Bicentennial celebration.

There are 13 statues from the National Statuary Hall Collection, representing the 13 original states, located in the crypt. They are:

- Samuel Adams from Massachusetts, marble, by Anne Whitney in 1876
- Billy Graham from North Carolina, bronze, by Chas Fagan in 2024
- John C. Calhoun from South Carolina, marble, by Frederick Ruckstull in 1910
- Charles Carroll from Maryland, bronze, by Richard E. Brooks in 1903
- Nathanael Greene from Rhode Island, marble, by Henry Kirke Brown in 1870
- Barbara Rose Johns from Virginia in 2025
- Robert R. Livingston from New York, bronze, by Erastus Dow Palmer in 1875
- Crawford W. Long from Georgia, marble, by J. Massey Rhind in 1926
- Peter Muhlenberg from Pennsylvania, marble, by Blanche Nevin in 1889
- Caesar Rodney from Delaware, marble, by Bryant Baker in 1934.
- Roger Sherman from Connecticut, marble, by Chauncey Ives in 1872
- John Stark from New Hampshire, marble, by Carl Conrads in 1894
- Richard Stockton from New Jersey, marble, by Henry Kirke Brown in 1888

The bronze statue of Confederate general Robert E. Lee from Virginia (by Edward V. Valentine, 1934) was removed on December 21, 2020. It was replaced by a statue of civil rights activist Barbara Rose Johns. The statue of Charles Brantley Aycock from North Carolina was replaced by the Statue of Billy Graham.
