= Lincoln catafalque =

Support for the casket of Abraham Lincoln while his body lay in state

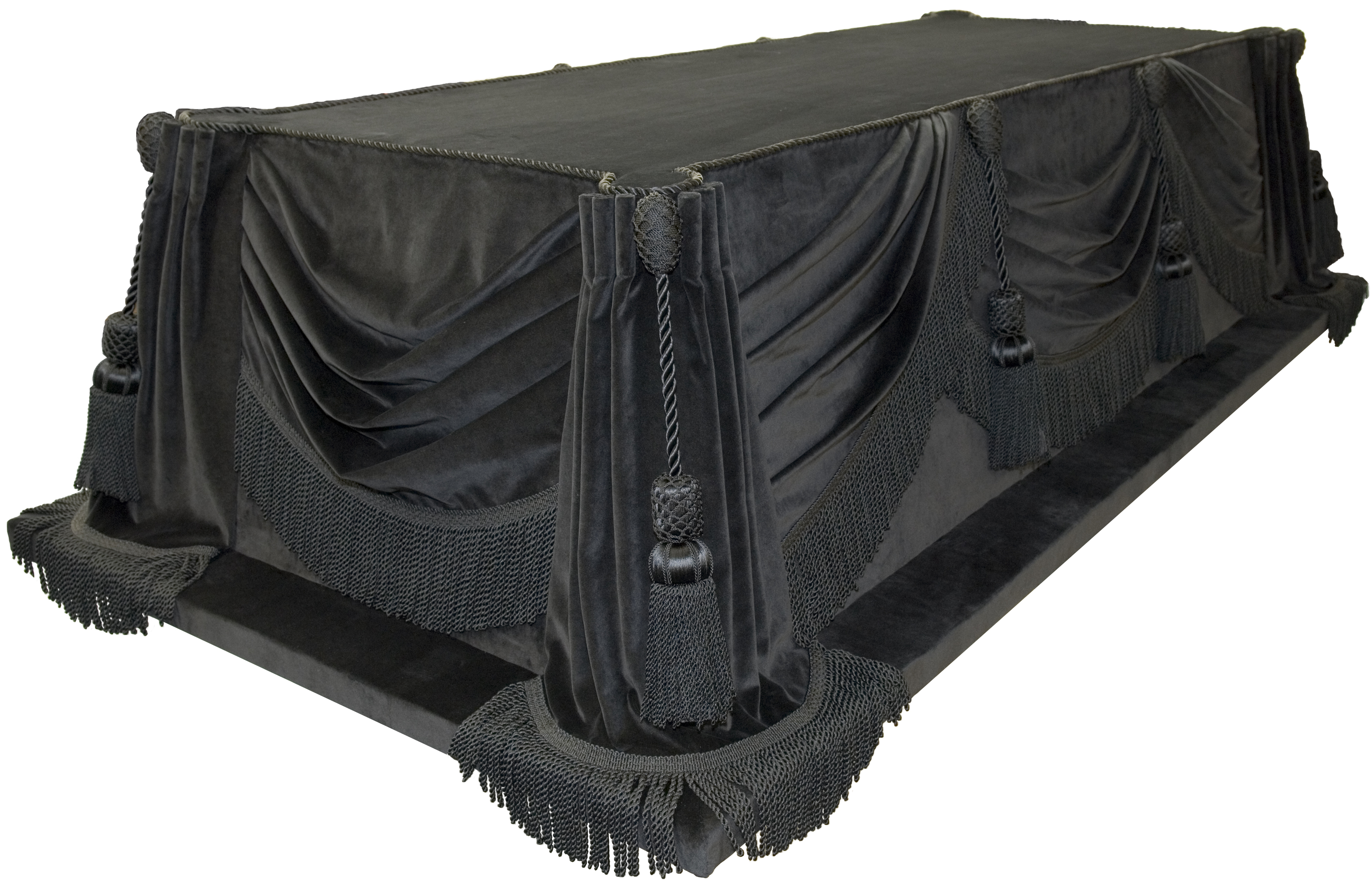
The Lincoln catafalque

The Lincoln catafalque is a catafalque constructed in 1865 to support the casket of Abraham Lincoln while the president's body lay in state in the Capitol rotunda in Washington, D.C. The catafalque has since been used for many who have lain in state in the Capitol rotunda.

No law, written rule, or regulation specifies who may lie in state; use of the Capitol rotunda is controlled by concurrent action of the House and Senate. Any person who has rendered distinguished service to the nation may lie in state if the family so wishes and Congress approves. In the case of unknown soldiers, the president or the appropriate branch of the armed forces initiates the action.

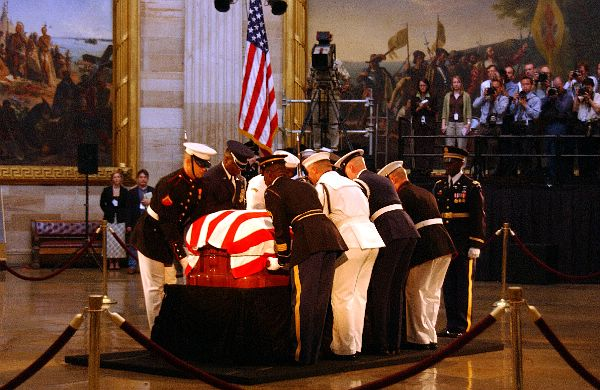
A ceremonial Honor Guard prepares to move the flag-draped casket of former President Ronald Reagan during his state funeral in the Capitol rotunda

Senators and representatives have lain in state on the catafalque elsewhere in the Capitol. An example of this was when the catafalque was used for the six hours that Senator Robert C. Byrd lay in repose on the Senate floor on July 1, 2010. The catafalque has also been used nine times in the Supreme Court building, for the lying in state of former chief justice Earl Warren on July 11–12, 1974; former justice Thurgood Marshall, January 27, 1993; former chief justice Warren E. Burger, June 28, 1995; former justice William J. Brennan Jr., July 28, 1997; Justice Harry A. Blackmun, March 8, 1999, Chief Justice William H. Rehnquist on September 6–7, 2005, Justice Antonin Scalia on February 19, 2016, Justice John Paul Stevens, July 22, 2019, and Justice Ruth Bader Ginsburg on September 23–24, 2020. In addition, it was used in the Department of Commerce building on April 9–10, 1996, for the lying in state of Secretary of Commerce Ronald H. Brown.

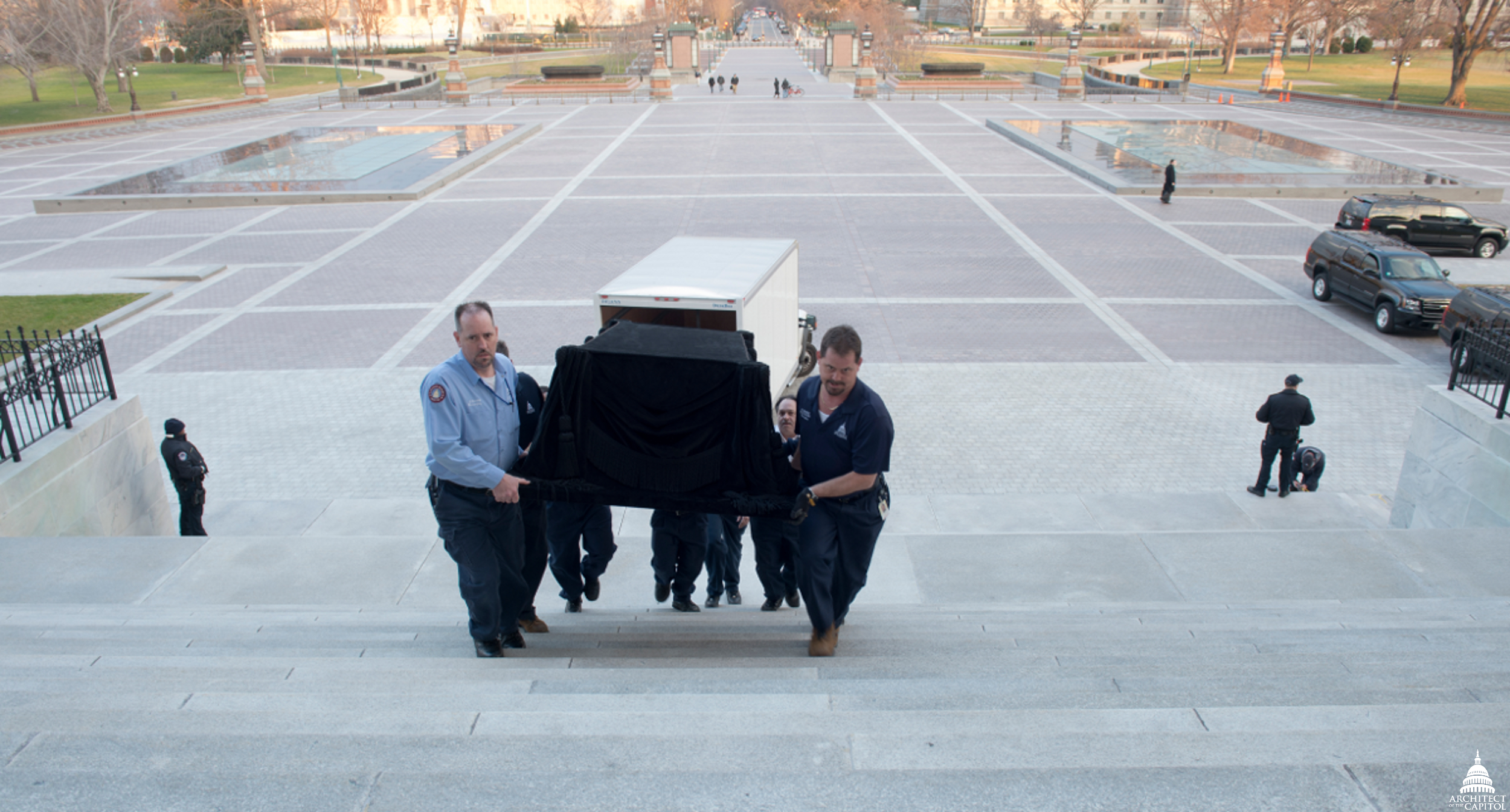
The catafalque being moved into the rotunda for Daniel Inouye's lying in state

The catafalque is a simple bier of rough pine boards nailed together and covered with black cloth. Although the base and platform have occasionally been altered to accommodate the larger size of modern coffins and for the ease of the attending military personnel, it is basically the same today as it was in Lincoln's time. Presently the catafalque measures 7 feet 1 inch (216 cm) long, 2 feet 6 inches (76 cm) wide, and 2 feet (61 cm) high. The attached base is 8 feet 10 inches (269 cm) long, 4 feet 3 1/2 inches (130.8 cm) wide, and 2 inches (5.1 cm) high. The platform is 11 feet 1 inch (338 cm) long, 6 feet (180 cm) wide, and 9 1/4 inches (23 cm) high. Although the cloth covering the catafalque has been replaced several times, the style of the drapery is similar to that used in 1865.

When not in use, the catafalque was previously kept in an area called Washington's Tomb in the crypt of the United States Capitol, which was intended as the final resting place for George Washington, the first president of the United States, but never used for that purpose. The catafalque is now displayed in the Exhibition Hall of the Capitol Visitor Center.

A list of those who have lain on the catafalque:

- Abraham Lincoln (April 19–21, 1865)
- Thaddeus Stevens (August 13–14, 1868)
- Charles Sumner (March 13, 1874)
- Henry Wilson (November 25–26, 1875)
- James A. Garfield (September 21–23, 1881)
- John Alexander Logan (December 30–31, 1886)
- William McKinley (September 17, 1901)
- Pierre Charles L'Enfant (April 28, 1909) reinterment
- George Dewey (January 20, 1917)
- Unknown Soldier of World War I (November 9–11, 1921)
- Warren G. Harding (August 8, 1923)
- William Howard Taft (March 11, 1930)
- John Joseph Pershing (July 18–19, 1948)
- Robert Alphonso Taft (August 2–3, 1953)
- Unknown Soldiers of World War II and the Korean War (May 28–30, 1958)
- John F. Kennedy (November 24–25, 1963)
- Douglas MacArthur (April 8–9, 1964)
- Herbert Hoover (October 23–25, 1964)
- Dwight D. Eisenhower (March 30–31, 1969)
- Everett McKinley Dirksen (September 9–10, 1969)
- J. Edgar Hoover (May 3–4, 1972)
- Lyndon B. Johnson (January 24–25, 1973)
- Hubert Humphrey (January 14–15, 1978)
- Unknown Soldier of Vietnam Era, later identified as Michael J. Blassie (May 25–28, 1984)
- Claude Denson Pepper (June 1–2, 1989)
- Thurgood Marshall (January 27, 1993)
- Ronald Reagan (June 9–11, 2004)
- William Rehnquist (September 6–7, 2005)
- Gerald Ford (December 30, 2006 – January 2, 2007)
- Robert C. Byrd (July 1, 2010)
- Daniel Inouye (December 19–20, 2012)
- Frank Lautenberg (June 6, 2013)
- Antonin Scalia (February 19, 2016)
- John McCain (August 31, 2018)
- George H. W. Bush (December 3–5, 2018)
- John Paul Stevens (July 22, 2019)
- Elijah Cummings (October 25, 2019)
- John Lewis (July 27, 2020)
- Ruth Bader Ginsburg (September 23–25, 2020)
- William Evans (April 13, 2021)
- Bob Dole (December 9, 2021)
- Sandra Day O'Connor (December 18, 2023)
- Jimmy Carter (January 7–9, 2025)
- Lindsey Graham (July 28, 2026)

== See also ==
- State funerals in the United States

== Notes ==
1.Justice Ruth Bader Ginsburg had lain on the steps of the Supreme Court of the United States on September 23 and 24, 2020, and inside the United States Capitol on September 25, 2020, in the National Statuary Hall.

== Sources ==
- "Catafalque". Architect of the Capitol. Retrieved on May 20, 2023.
