= Harry Bingham Brown =

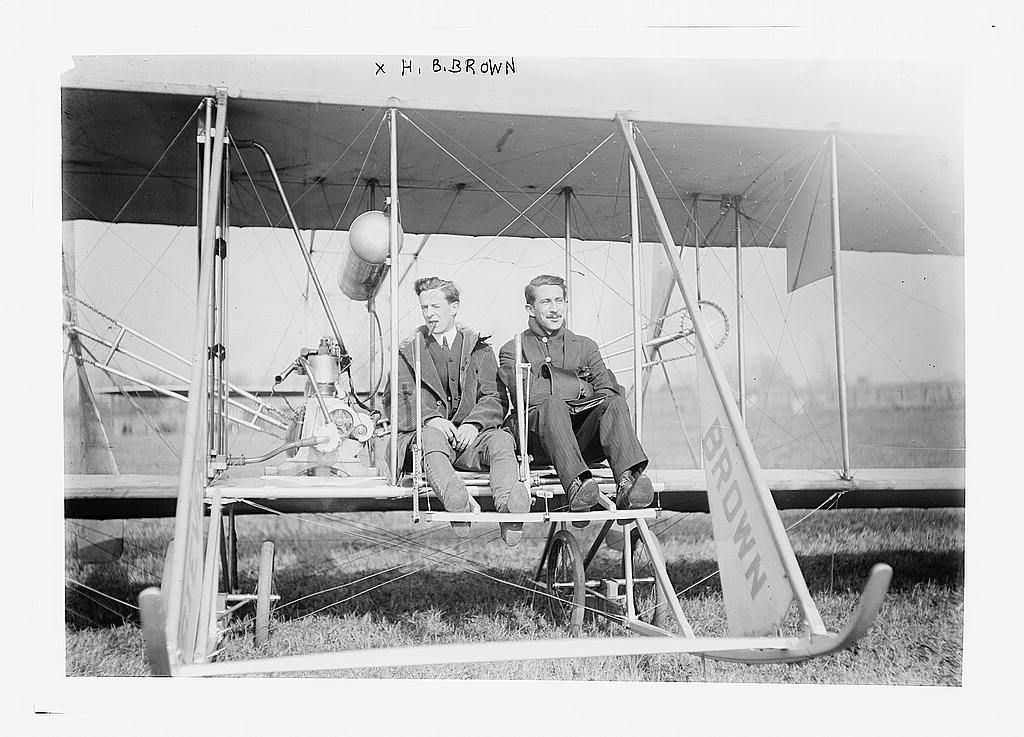
- Harry Bingham Brown on the left
- Born: October 9, 1883
- Died: 1954 (aged 70–71)
- Occupation: pioneer aviator

Harry Bingham Brown (October 9, 1883 – 1954), was a pioneer aviator.

== Biography ==
He was born on October 9, 1883. He set an American height record for carrying a passenger in 1912.

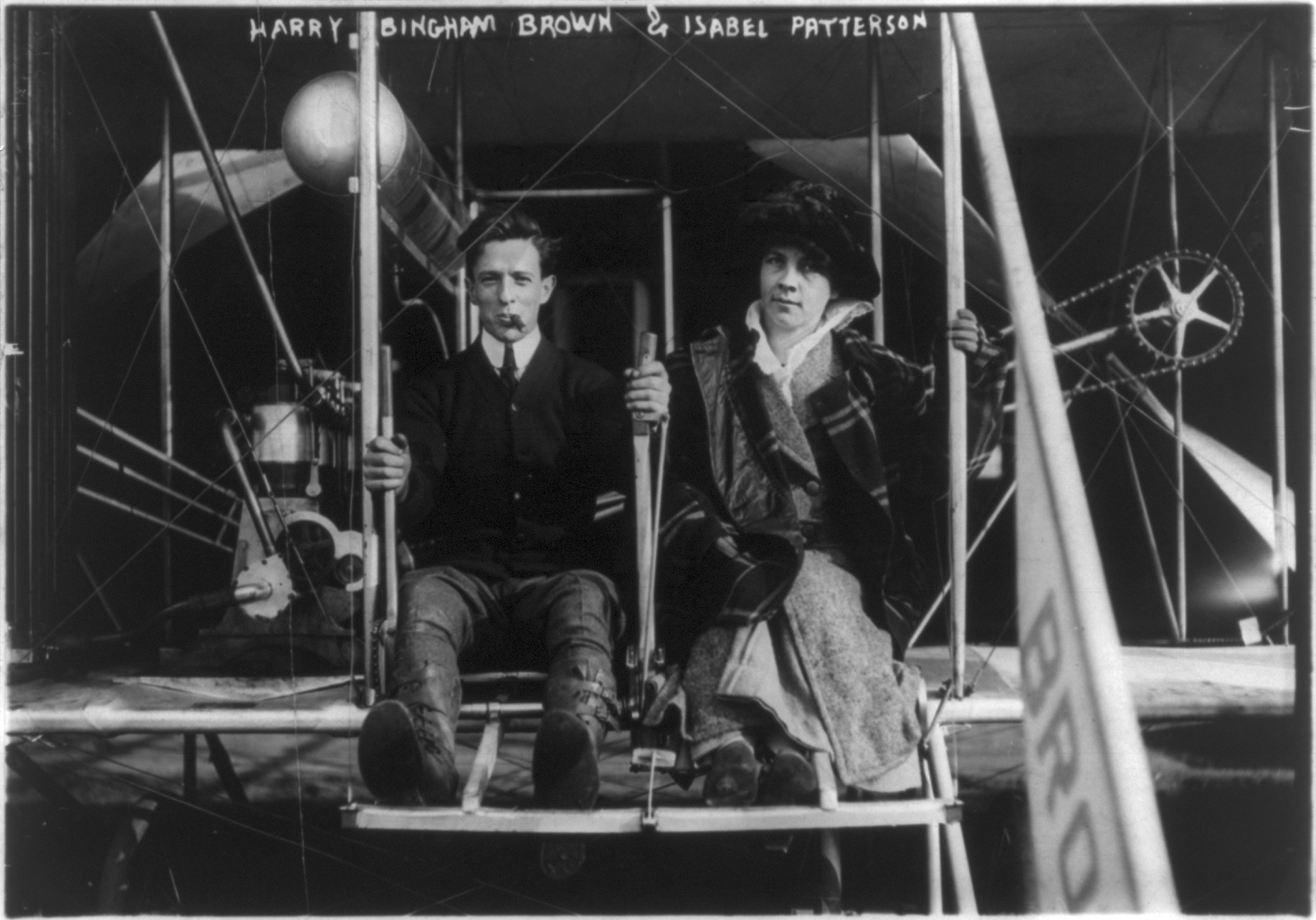
