= Henry Brown (minister, born 1823) =

American minister and leader of the Underground Railroad (1823–1906)

The Reverend Henry Brown
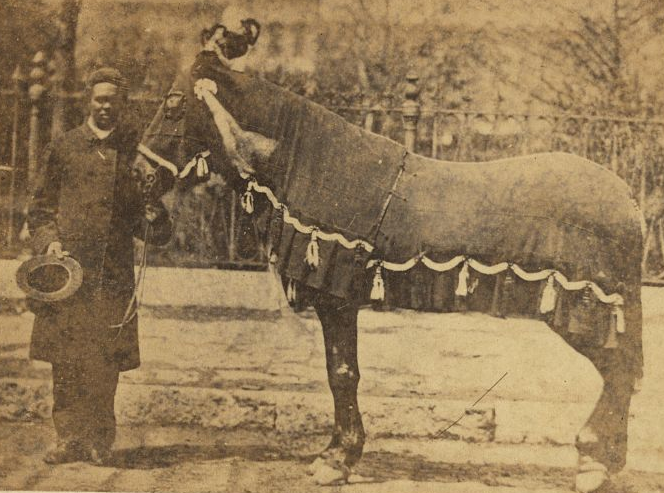
- Brown with Old Bob at the funeral of Abraham Lincoln, 1865
- Born: April 17, 1823; Raleigh, North Carolina, U.S.
- Died: September 3, 1906 (aged 83); Springfield, Illinois, U.S.
- Resting place: Oak Ridge Cemetery
- Occupations: Minister; abolitionist; handyman
- Spouse: Mary A. King (m. 1847)
- Children: 5

Henry Brown (April 17, 1823 – September 3, 1906) was an American minister of the African Methodist Episcopal Church, abolitionist, and leader of the Underground Railroad.

== Early life and education ==
Brown was born into slavery on a plantation in Raleigh, North Carolina on April 17, 1823.

In 1835 at the age of 12, Brown was separated from his family and moved to Ohio. In 1837, he was purchased as an indentured servant for a Quaker family in Indiana, where he was a farm laborer. He received his freedom through manumission at around the age of 20.

Brown was self-taught through reading literature and the Bible.

== Career ==
In 1846, Brown was ordained as a minister in the African Methodist Episcopal Church. Brown was a frequent preacher at congregations in the Midwest.

After moving to Springfield, Illinois in around 1848, Brown became an active leader and "conductor" in the Underground Railroad in Quincy and Springfield, assisting individuals escaping slavery and in pursuit of freedom.

Brown was an active advocate for the rights of African Americans, serving as a delegate to the 1853 Illinois Colored Convention which advocated in favor of repealing discriminatory laws impacting African Americans.

After the American Civil War, Brown was a frequent guest speaker at public events, where he recalled memories of the war and celebrated the end of slavery in the United States. In 1873, he was the keynote speaker at Springfield's commemoration celebration of the Fifteenth Amendment to the United States Constitution.

=== Association with Abraham Lincoln ===
In around 1848, Brown became acquainted with Abraham Lincoln, the future President of the United States. To supplement his "meager" income as a preacher, Brown worked for Lincoln and his family for over 12 years, serving in various roles as a handyman, shoemaker, and assistant until Lincoln and his family moved to Washington, D.C. in 1861 after he was elected president. Brown remained a friend of the Lincoln family after they moved.

After Lincoln's death in 1865, Brown received a telegram from the Lincoln family requesting that he take part in Lincoln's Springfield funeral procession. Brown was given the task of leading Lincoln's beloved driving horse, "Old Bob," in the procession, whose spot was immediately behind the hearse and in front of the carriage carrying Robert Todd Lincoln.

== Personal life ==
In 1847, Brown married Mary A. King in Paris, Illinois. They had five children, including a son, Thomas, who became one of the first African Americans admitted to practice law in Illinois.

== Death ==
Brown died in 1906 at the age of 83. He is interred at Oak Ridge Cemetery in close proximity to the Lincoln Tomb.

== Legacy ==
The "Henry Brown Lodge No 22" Masonic lodge in Peoria, Illinois is named after Brown.

Brown has been portrayed by reenactors of the Lincoln funeral procession.
