= Harry Browne (cricketer) =

English cricketer

Personal information
- Full name: Harry Ernest Browne
- Born: 19 June 1874; Dharwar, Mysore, British India
- Died: 10 January 1944 (aged 69); Taunton, Somerset, England
- Batting: Unknown
- Bowling: Unknown

Domestic team information
- Years: Team
- 1895/96–1900/01: Europeans

Career statistics
Competition	First-class
Matches	8
Runs scored	126
Batting average	10.50
100s/50s	–/–
Top score	23
Balls bowled	349
Wickets	12
Bowling average	16.91
5 wickets in innings	–
10 wickets in match	–
Best bowling	4/20
Catches/stumpings	4/–
- Source: ESPNcricinfo, 13 November 2022

Harry Ernest Browne (19 June 1874 – 10 January 1944) was an English first-class cricketer and British Indian Army officer.

The son of Colonel Charles Michael Browne, he was born in British India at Dharwar. He attended the Royal Military College at Sandhurst, graduating in October 1894 as a second lieutenant with a view to appointment to the Indian Staff Corps. He was appointed to the Corps in February 1896, While serving in British India, Brown played first-class cricket for the Europeans cricket team on eight occasions in the Bombay Presidency Match between 1895 and 1900. He scored 126 runs at an average of 10.50 in his eight matches, with a highest score of 23. With the ball, he took 12 wickets at a bowling average of 16.91, with best figures of 4 for 20. In the British Indian Army, Browne was promoted to lieutenant in January 1897, with promotion to captain in October 1903. He served in the Dervish war between 1903 and 1904. By October 1912, he was serving with the 47th Sikhs and was promoted to major. Browne served with the British Indian Army during the First World War, with him being wounded in action which necessitated his retirement on grounds of ill health in October 1917. Browne died at Taunton in January 1944 and was survived by his wife, Rita.
