= Henry Brown (minister, born 1848) =

American clergyman and missionary

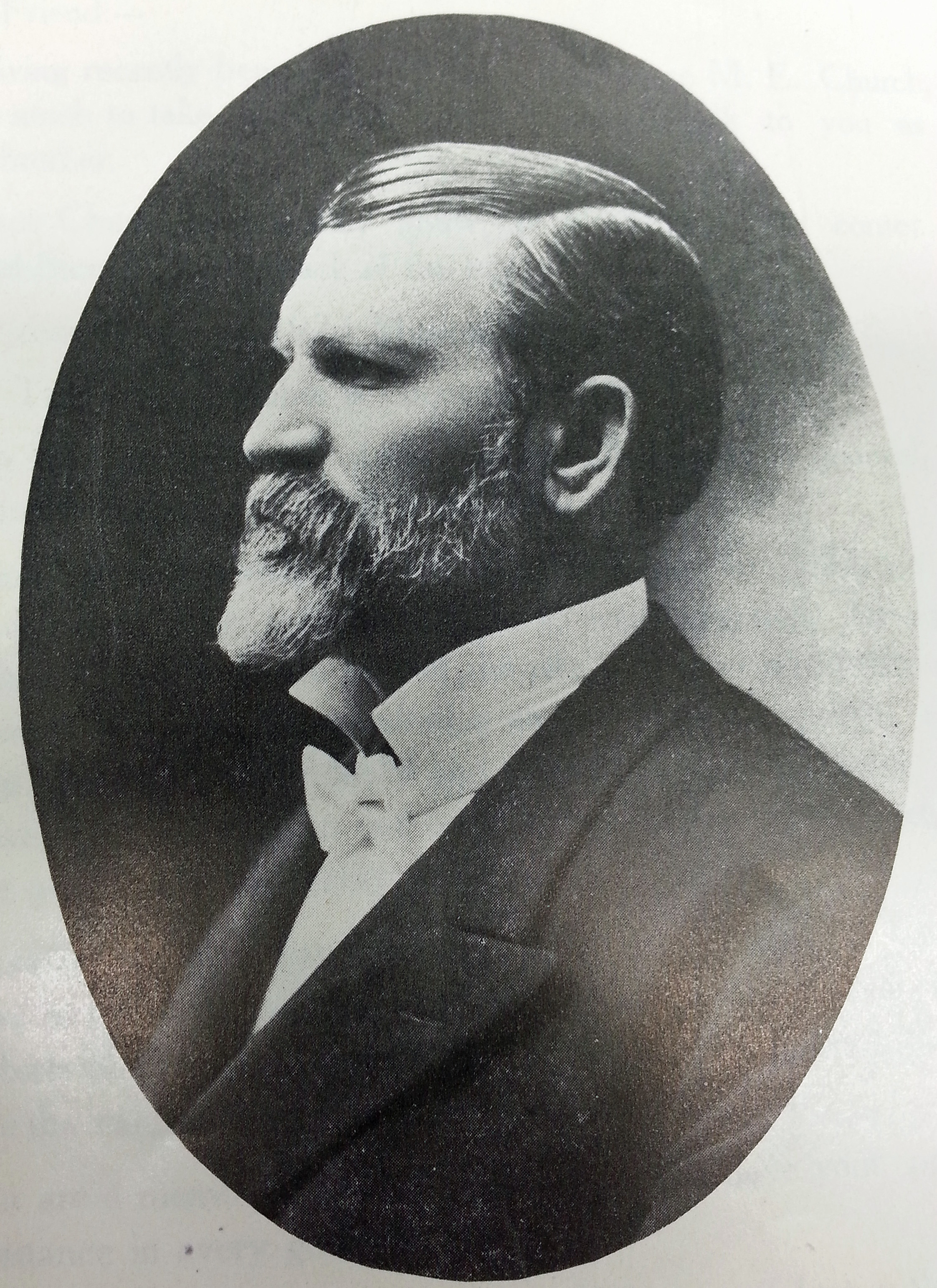
Portrait of Rev. Dr. Henry Brown

Henry Brown (July 20, 1848 – 1931) was a Methodist missionary and minister in Washington state at the turn of the century, a prohibitionist, and an author of one book.

Born in Guernsey County, Ohio, Reverend Dr. Henry Brown was the presiding elder of the Spokane District of the Columbia River Conference for many years during the 1890s to the early 1900s.

== Support of prohibition ==
Brown was a prohibitionist, and continually challenged local papers coverage of prohibition and its supporters, especially the Daily Journal in Walla Walla, which in January 1888 announced it would not publish a proposed article in support of prohibition. Brown challenged the editor on the grounds that newspapers were meant to act as a "mirror to reflect public opinion" and that excluding the support of a policy that the editor disagreed with would be a disservice to the paper’s patrons.

== Support of women's suffrage ==
Brown was a vocal supporter of women’s suffrage in the Washington Territory, one of the first territories in which women gained the right to vote through full enfranchisement in 1883. Brown wrote many letters to the editor of the Daily Journal in Walla Walla about the paper’s representation of women’s newly acquired right to vote. In 1887, a year before the Washington Territorial Supreme Court revoked women’s right to vote, the paper asserted that the Union did not want to force women to vote, but that many women, once they could vote, only voted in the first ballot out of curiosity and thereafter ceased to vote as the novelty of voting dissipated. Brown challenged this interpretation, writing that the Union did not force men to vote, so why would they force women to do so? He argued that while the Union did not believe in forcing women to vote, it did believe in forcing women to abstain from voting, and that the Union would continue to reinforce and perpetuate the legal barriers that kept women from voting.

== As author ==
Brown published one book, The Impending Peril: Or, Methodism and Amusement, which describes the dangers that "popular amusements of the day" posed to Christianity. In his preface, he went as far as to say that popular amusements were "insidious attacks" and that they emanated "evil"

His book also describes his support of prohibition – specifically, that he believed that as God created the ten commandments, the "moral law", it was up to religious leaders like himself to help make moral laws, as "the world has not yet been won over to righteousness." The Impending Peril was published at a time when many in the Methodist church were pressing for the official relaxation of the rules governing leisure activities, citing the demand for a "freer life" for members in good standing in the church. Brown’s book pushed back against the increasing desire for more liberal rules and fewer restrictions, asserting that if the rules were to be loosened, current members would leave the church and the church would begin to attract people who were less committed than current members.
