= Harold Brown (footballer) =

Australian rules footballer

Personal information
- Full name: Harold Leslie Harpur Brown
- Born: 19 September 1878; Hawthorn, Victoria
- Died: 11 March 1940 (aged 61); East Melbourne, Victoria
- Original team: Melbourne Grammar

Playing career^{1}
Years	Club	Games (Goals)
1897–1898	Essendon	8 (1)
1899–1900	St Kilda	14 (0)
Total		22 (1)
- ^{1} Playing statistics correct to the end of 1900.

Harold Leslie Harpur Brown (19 September 1878 – 11 March 1940) was an Australian rules footballer who played with Essendon and St Kilda in the Victorian Football League (VFL).
