= Henry Brown (inventor) =

American inventor

Henry Brown was an American inventor, perhaps best known as the inventor of a type of paper storage box.

Little is known about his life, other than that he was living in Washington D.C. when he initially filed his patent. Henry Brown developed a type of compartmented storage box intended to keep sheets of carbon paper separate from each other, and patented his invention (number 352,036) on November 2, 1886. It has been credited as one of the earliest prototypes for a safe deposit box.
