= United States Capitol Visitor Center =

Underground visitor center in Washington DC

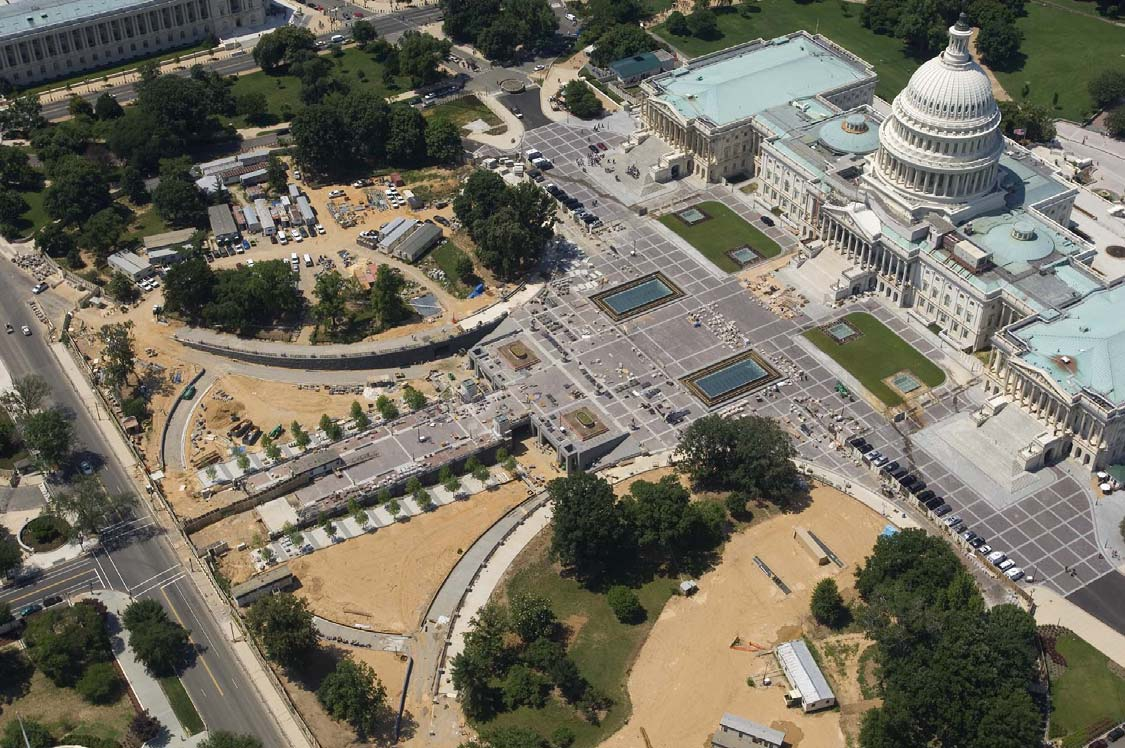
- Aerial view (2007)

- Location within Central Washington, D.C.

General information
- Type: Underground visitor center
- Location: United States Capitol Complex, Washington, D.C., United States
- Coordinates: 38.8896°N 77.0075°W
- Construction started: June 20, 2000
- Opened: December 2, 2008

Technical details
- Structural system: Type I – Fire Resistive (steel and concrete)
- Floor count: Three floors

Design and construction
- Architect: RTKL Associates Inc.
- Structural engineer: Balfour Beatty (formerly Centex Construction)
- Main contractor: Manhattan Construction Company

The United States Capitol Visitor Center (CVC) is a large underground addition to the United States Capitol complex which serves as a gathering point for up to 4,000 tourists and an expansion space for the U.S. Congress. Opened in 2008, it is located on 1st Street East below the landscaped tree-shaded grounds of the East Front of the Capitol and included the development of the surface plaza (which had previously served as a parking lot since the mid-1920s). Additional, transparent skylights also punctuate the surface plaza to allow light into the center. The complex contains 580,000 square feet (54,000 m^{2}) of space below ground on three levels. The overall project's budget was $621 million.

The CVC has additional space for use by the Congress, including multiple meeting and conference rooms. On the south / House side, there is a large room which is most likely to be used by a committee. A Congressional Auditorium, a 450-seat theater, is also available for use by members of Congress or for either House of Congress should it be needed.

The CVC officially opened on December 2, 2008. This date was selected to coincide with the 145th anniversary of placing Thomas Crawford's sculpted iconic Statue of Freedom atop the Capitol dome and building in 1863, signifying the completion of construction of its new second dome.

== Design concept ==
The CVC contains three underground levels: a balcony level entrance, the Emancipation Hall (second) level and a third restricted level for new congressional offices and meeting rooms. The construction of the CVC represents the largest-ever expansion of the United States Capitol and more than doubles the footprint of the U.S. Capitol building complex.

The American Institute of Architects presented RTKL Associates Inc. with the Award of Excellence in Historic Resources for their work on the U.S. Capitol Visitor Center. The award was presented at the Architecture Week Closing Party & Design Awards Gala on September 30, 2010, in Washington, D.C.

== Construction history ==
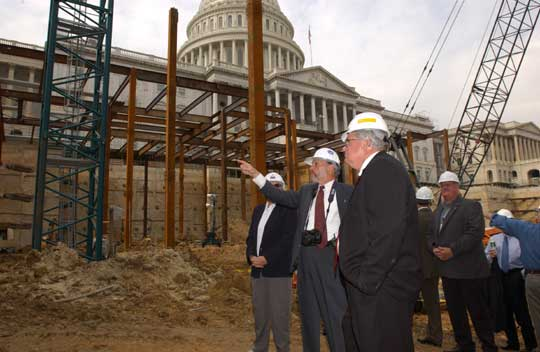
Former House Speaker Dennis Hastert and former Architect of the Capitol Alan Hantman tour the CVC during the early stages of construction.

Construction of the CVC was supervised by the Architect of the Capitol. That post was held by Alan Hantman, FAIA until his term expired on February 4, 2007; construction was then continued by then Acting Architect of the Capitol Stephen T. Ayers, AIA, LEED AP.

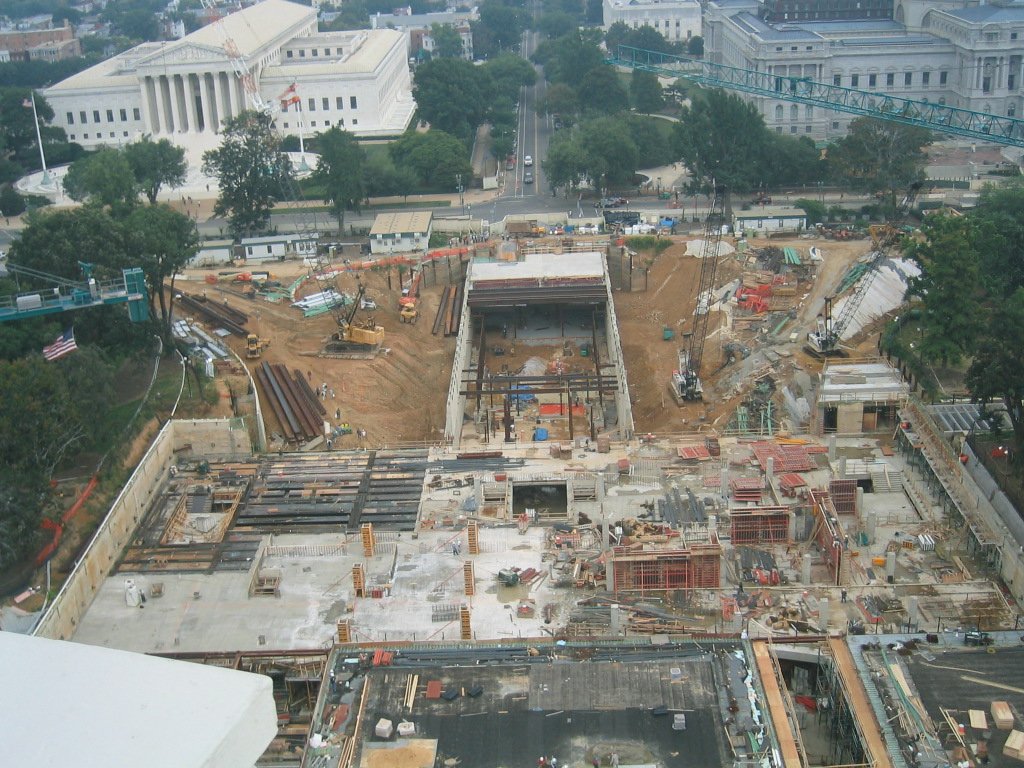
Construction of the CVC in July 2004

The ceremonial groundbreaking for the CVC took place on June 20, 2000. Although originally planned to be completed by January 2004, the final completion date (not including the Senate and House expansion space) was extended to December 2, 2008. The proposed cost was originally $71 million, but it has risen to $621 million. The CVC has caused controversy for being over budget and behind schedule. Much of this is blamed on the rising cost of fuel, post-9/11 security measures, and inclement weather. At a hearing on the CVC cost-overruns Representative Jack Kingston called it "a monument to government inefficiency, ineptitude and excessiveness."

The first major construction contract, worth nearly $100 million, was awarded to Balfour Beatty (formerly Centex Construction), in the spring of 2002. This contract involved site demolition, slurry wall construction, excavation, construction of columns, installation of site utilities, construction of the concrete and structural steel, waterproofing, and construction of a new service tunnel. By July 2005, Balfour Beatty Construction completed all excavation and structural activities, and the roof deck covered the entire CVC structure.

Manhattan Construction Company was responsible for the build-out including, installation of electrical, mechanical and plumbing systems, coordination with existing Capitol building systems where the center connects within the Capitol building, and completion of the above-ground East Front Plaza, with related site work and security elements.

== Operations and features ==
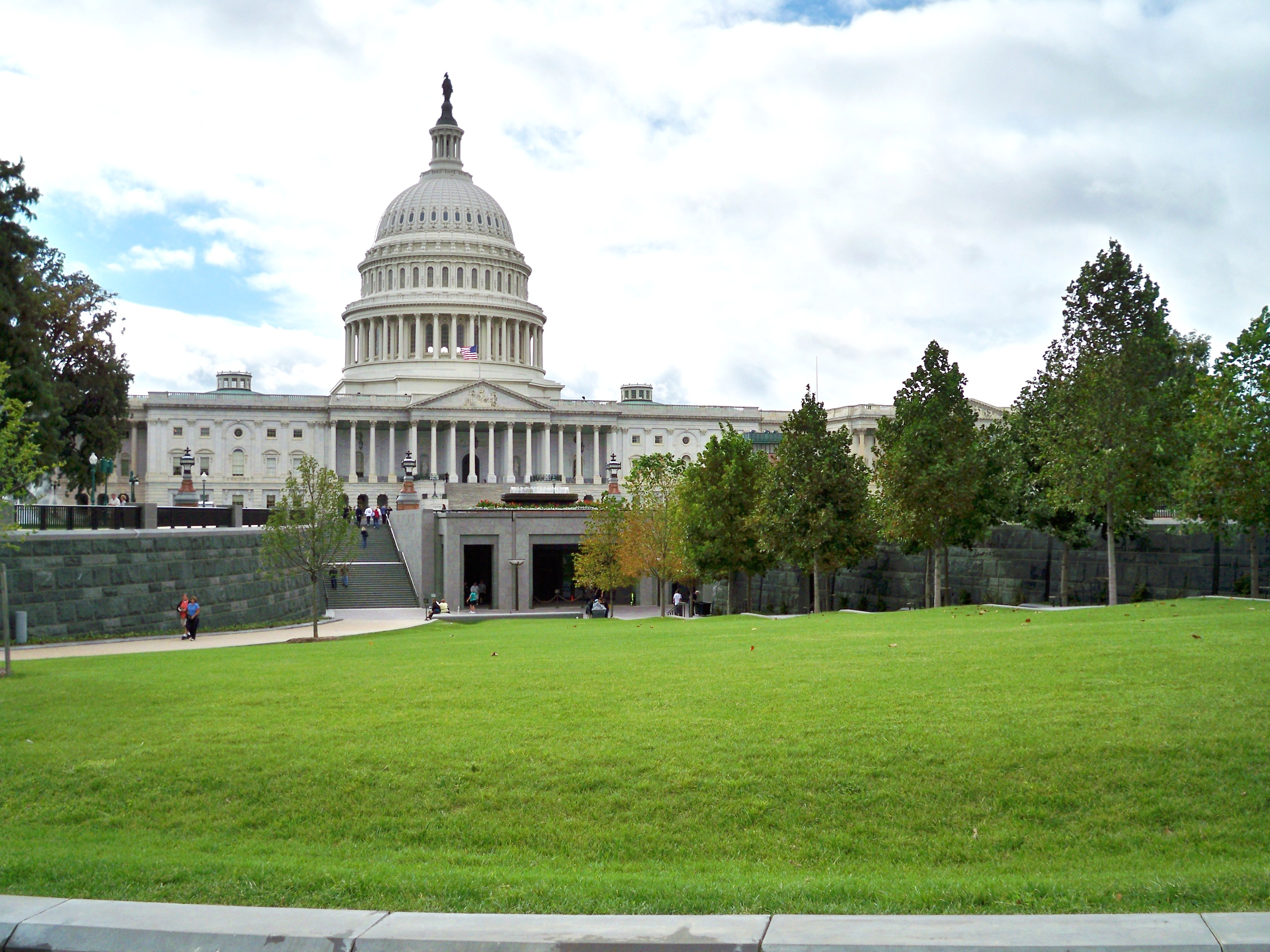
Entrance to the Visitor Center

The space is mainly designed for use as a holding zone for visitors waiting to take tours of the Capitol. The number of annual visitors to the Capitol has tripled from 1,000,000 in 1970 to nearly 3,000,000 as of recent times, and it has become difficult to deal with the congestion caused by such crowds. In the past, visitors were required to line up on the Capitol's east stairs, sometimes stretching all the way to 1st Street East. This wait could last hours and no protection was offered against inclement weather. Tickets were not timed and were on a first-come, first-served basis.

With the addition of the CVC, visitors now have a secure, handicap-accessible, and educational place to wait before their Capitol tours commence. Visitors are free to explore the CVC, which houses an exhibition hall, two gift shops, and a 530-seat food court. Visiting the CVC and the Capitol are free. Tickets for Capitol tours are also free and are available online for order ahead of time.

=== Emancipation Hall ===
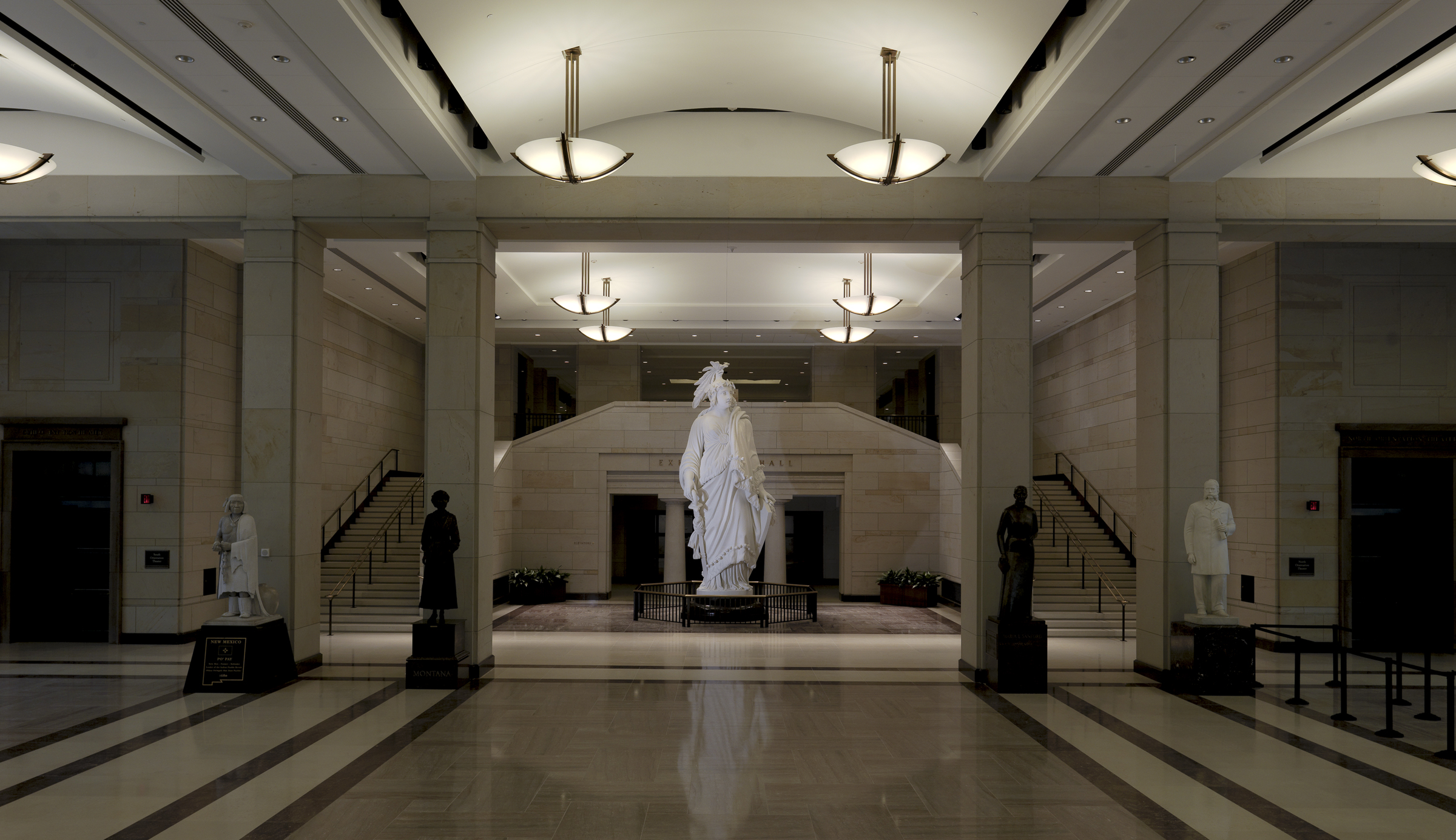
Emancipation Hall at the Capitol Visitor Center. The 1857 plaster cast of the Statue of Freedom is in the center flanked by stairs which lead to the Capitol itself.

Emancipation Hall is the main hall of the CVC and measures in at 20,000 square feet (1,900 m^{2}). It was originally designated the Great Hall, but this was changed to Emancipation Hall when a bill cosponsored by Congressman Zach Wamp and Jesse L. Jackson, Jr. was passed by Congress and signed by President George W. Bush in January 2008. Emancipation Hall contains two large skylights, which each measure 30 feet (9.1 m) by 70 feet (21 m) and allow for a view of the Capitol dome never before seen. The skylights allow a significant amount of natural light into the hall and are surrounded by pools of water and seating on the roof deck.

The Hall displays the original 1857 plaster cast of the Statue of Freedom, the bronze statue that stands atop the Capitol dome. It was moved to the Hall from the basement rotunda of the Russell Senate Office Building, across Constitution Avenue from the Capitol, where it had stood since January 1993.

The Hall also displays 24 statues of the National Statuary Hall Collection. The complete collection is made up of two statues from each state. The statues are donated by their respective state to honor notable residents. In the past years, all 100 statues have been housed in the Capitol, many in Statuary Hall. This has led to overcrowding of statues and relocating some of them to Emancipation Hall has allowed for some space to be reclaimed. According to the Acting Architect of the Capitol Steven T. Ayers, more-recently added statues have been given preference for a move to Emancipation Hall.

On April 28, 2009, a bust of Sojourner Truth was dedicated in Emancipation Hall.

=== Exhibition Hall ===
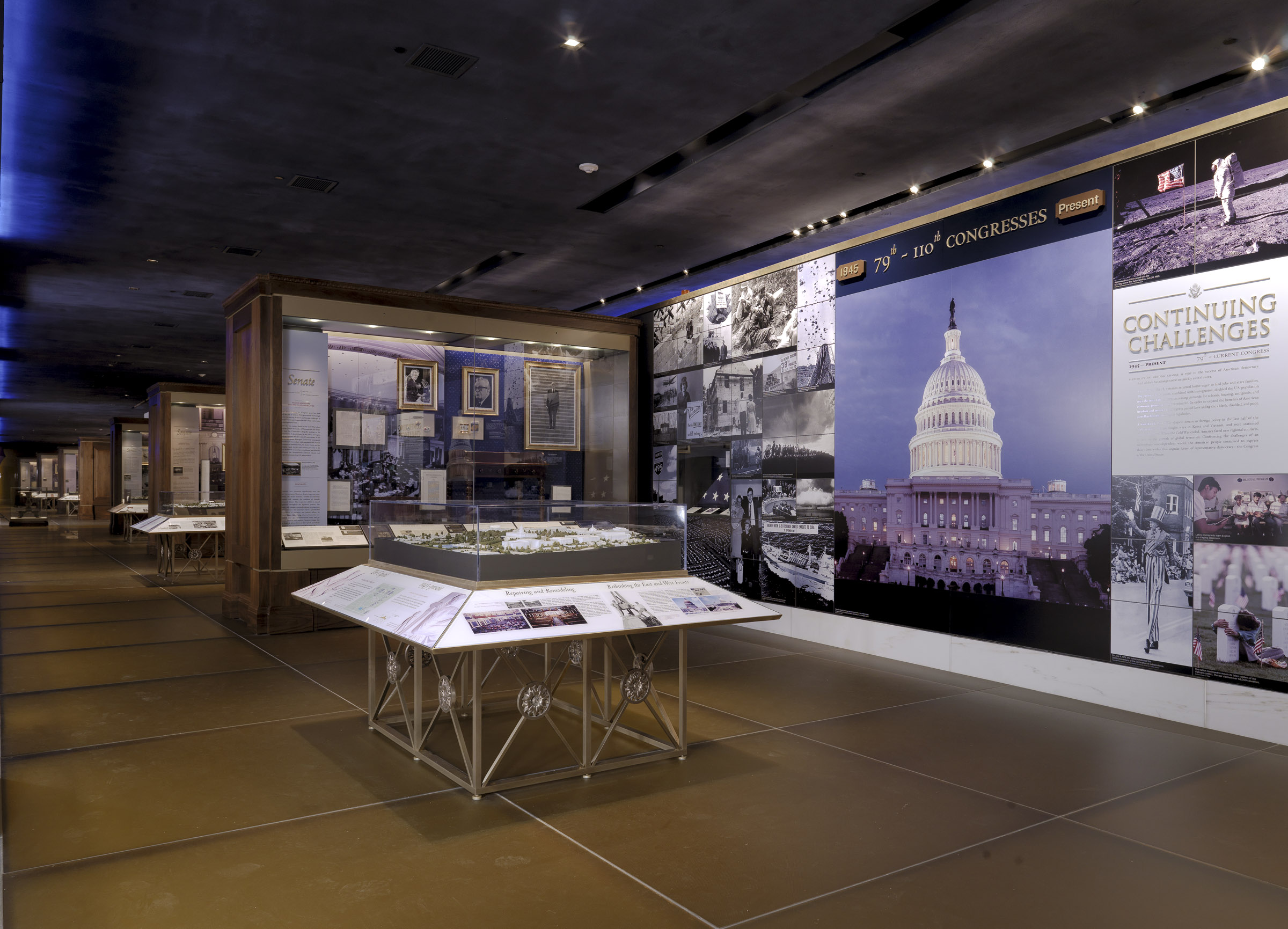
Exhibition Hall section centering on 1945–present

The Exhibition Hall includes an 11-foot (3.4 m) high tactile polyurethane model of the Capitol dome. The hall is dominated by a pair of curving 93-foot (28 m) marble walls lined with artifacts and interactive touch-screen displays. Included in the collection are documents signed by George Washington and Abraham Lincoln. Six scale models of the complete Capitol illustrate how the building expanded over time. Two alcoves off the main Exhibition Hall hold large flat screen televisions to allow viewers to watch live telecasts of the House and Senate floor proceedings. A third alcove located behind the tactile dome model on the main axis of the Capitol holds the Lincoln catafalque, which used to be displayed in the basement beneath the crypt. It closed in March 2019 to undergo renovations. It reopened in 2022.

=== Other facilities and spaces ===
Two theaters located above the Exhibition Hall continuously show a 13-minute video on the history of Congress and the Capitol Complex. Visitors enter the theaters at the Emancipation Hall (lower) level and exit at the staging (upper) level. The theaters will show the same film, but on a staggered schedule to allow a smooth flow of tourists into the Capitol.

Off of Emancipation Hall are two gift shops, one at the north end of the Hall and on at the south end. These replace the single gift shop previously located in the Capitol Crypt.

The CVC includes a 530-seat food court, which is expected to alleviate overcrowding in the cafeterias in the Congressional office buildings.

==== Congressional space ====
About 170,000 square feet (16,000 m^{2}) has been reserved for use by Congress. Much of the space is for a new Congressional Auditorium. Most of the rest of the space will be made into committee meeting rooms.

==== Service space ====
A number of tunnels were constructed as part of the CVC project. The first is a 1,000-foot (300 m) long truck service tunnel, whose entrance is located north of Constitution Avenue near the underground Senate parking garage. Its goal is to alleviate traffic on the plaza and to enhance security by checking delivery and service trucks at a safe distance from the Capitol itself. A second tunnel was constructed to connect the CVC to the Library of Congress. Part of East Capitol Street was closed during construction and the tunnel was completed in the winter of 2005.

== Criticism ==
=== Costs ===
The high cost of building the Capitol Visitor Center has been an ongoing source of controversy for the project. Time magazine projected the total cost to be nearly $600 million. Critics cited its three auditoriums, the largest cafeteria in Washington, and a tunnel that links the Capitol Visitor Center to the Library of Congress as a symbol of federal and Congressional overspending.

=== Religious criticism ===
In addition to the controversy attendant upon the repeated delays and cost overruns, Republicans have criticized the center for what they view as insufficient coverage of American religious heritage. Senator Jim DeMint of South Carolina said that the CVC fails to "appropriately honor our religious heritage that has been critical to America's success." Former Speaker of the House Newt Gingrich started a petition seeking to more prominently recognize religion at the center. At the time of its construction, the CVC had a plaque which declared the national motto to be "E Pluribus Unum," a traditionally used motto from the Great Seal of the United States, but not the official United States motto. It has since been changed to the official motto, "In God We Trust." Some of these controversies were briefly addressed by Beth Plemmons, Chief Executive Officer for Visitor Services at the Capitol Visitor Center, during her testimony on May 16, 2018, at a hearing before the Committee on House Administration, U.S. House of Representatives.

== See also ==
- National Visitor Center
- Visitor center
