= Native Americans in the United States =

Indigenous peoples of the United States

Native Americans
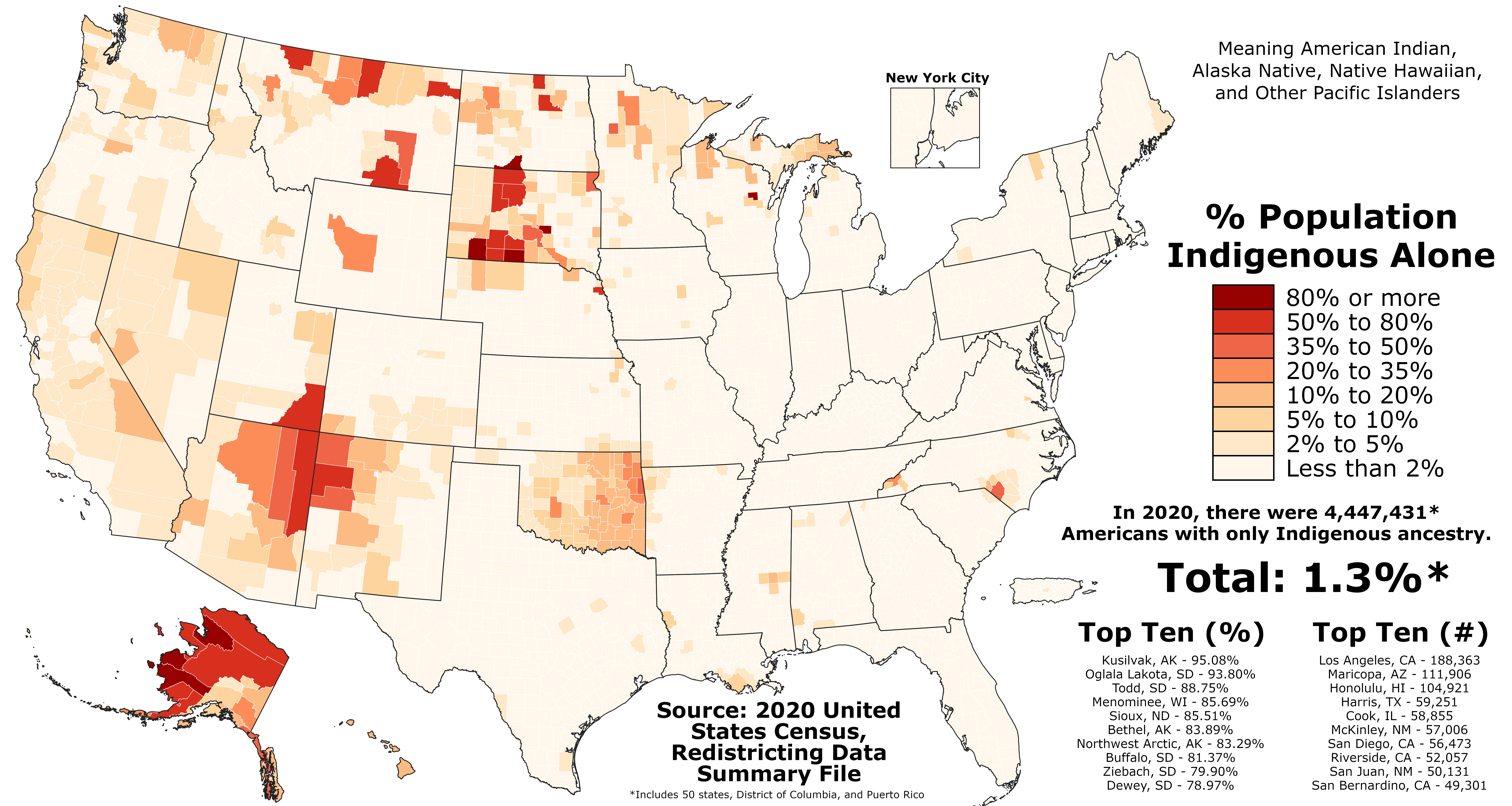
- Proportion of Native Americans in each county as of the 2020 US census

Total population
- Alone (one race) ▲3,727,135 (2020 census) ▲1.12% of the total US population • Native Americans: 2,251,699 (0.67%) • Native Hispanics: 1,475,436 (0.45%) In combination (multiracial) ▲5,938,923 (2020 census) ▲1.79% of the total US population Alone or in combination ▲9,666,058 (2020 census) ▲2.92% of the total US population

Regions with significant populations
- Predominantly in Alaska and the Western and Midwestern United States due to the policy of Indian removal, with smaller communities remaining in the East.
- California: 631,016
- Oklahoma: 332,791
- Arizona: 319,512
- Texas: 278,948
- New Mexico: 212,241

Languages
- English; Native American languages (including Navajo, Central Alaskan Yup'ik, Tlingit, Haida, Dakota, Seneca, Lakota, Western Apache, Keres, Cherokee, Choctaw, Creek, Kiowa, Comanche, Osage, Zuni, Pawnee, Shawnee, Winnebago, Ojibwe, Cree, O'odham, Wendat); Spanish; Native Pidgin (extinct); French

Religion
- Predominantly Traditional Native American religions, unique to specific tribes or bands; Native American Church; Christian, denomination dependent on tribe; Protestant; Catholic; Russian Orthodox (mostly in Alaska)

Related ethnic groups
- Indigenous peoples of the Americas; Indigenous peoples in Canada; Indigenous peoples of Mexico; Indigenous peoples of South America

Native Americans (also called Indians, American Indians, First Americans, and Indigenous Americans) are the Indigenous peoples of the United States, particularly of the lower 48 states and Alaska. They may also include any Americans whose origins lie in any of the Indigenous peoples of North or South America. The United States Census Bureau publishes data about "American Indians and Alaska Natives", whom it defines as anyone "having origins in any of the original peoples of North and South America ... and who maintains tribal affiliation or community attachment". The census does not, however, enumerate "Native Americans" as such, noting that the latter term can encompass a broader set of groups, e.g. Native Hawaiians, which it tabulates separately.

The European colonization of the Americas from 1492 resulted in a precipitous decline in the size of the Native American population because of wars, ethnic cleansing, enslavement, and newly introduced diseases, including weaponized diseases and biological warfare by colonizers. (Note: Attributed to multiple references:) Numerous scholars have classified elements of the colonization process as comprising genocide against Native Americans. As part of a policy of settler colonialism, European settlers continued to wage war and perpetrated massacres against Native American peoples, removed them from their ancestral lands, and subjected them to one-sided government treaties and discriminatory government policies. Into the 20th century, these policies focused on forced assimilation.

When the United States was established, Native American tribes were considered semi-independent nations, because they generally lived in communities which were separate from communities of European settler colonizers. The federal government signed treaties at a government-to-government level until the Indian Appropriations Act of 1871 ended recognition of independent Native nations, and started treating them as "domestic dependent nations" subject to applicable federal laws. This law did preserve rights and privileges, including a large degree of tribal sovereignty. For this reason, many Native American reservations are still independent of state law and the actions of tribal citizens on these reservations are subject only to tribal courts and federal law. The Indian Citizenship Act of 1924 granted US citizenship to all Native Americans born in the US who had not yet obtained it. This emptied the "Indians not taxed" category established by the United States Constitution, allowed Natives to vote in elections, and extended the Fourteenth Amendment protections granted to people "subject to the jurisdiction" of the United States. However, some states continued to deny Native Americans voting rights for decades. Titles II through VII of the Civil Rights Act of 1968 comprise the Indian Civil Rights Act, which applies to Native American tribes and makes many but not all of the guarantees of the U.S. Bill of Rights applicable within the tribes.

Since the 1960s, Native American self-determination movements have resulted in positive changes to the lives of many Native Americans, though there are still many contemporary issues faced by them. Today, there are over five million Native Americans in the US, about 80% of whom live outside reservations. As of 2020, the states with the highest percentage of Native Americans are Alaska, Oklahoma, Arizona, California, New Mexico, and Texas.

== History ==
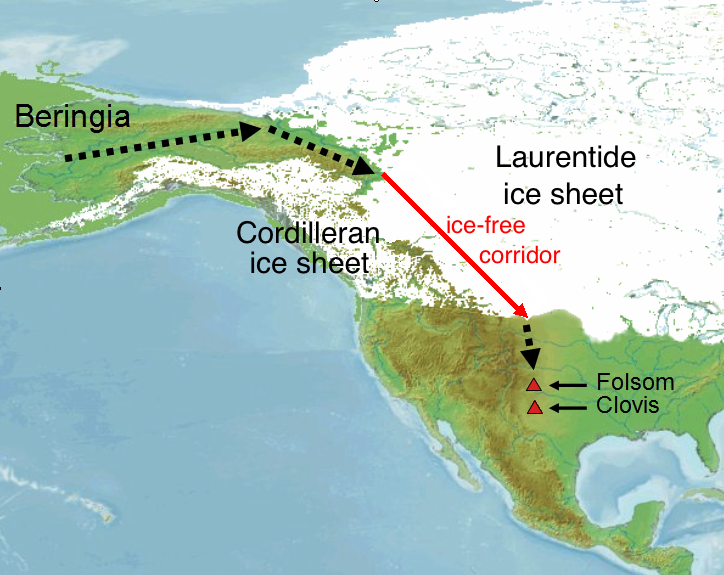
A map showing the approximate location of the ice-free corridor and Paleo-Indian settlements during the era of Clovis culture

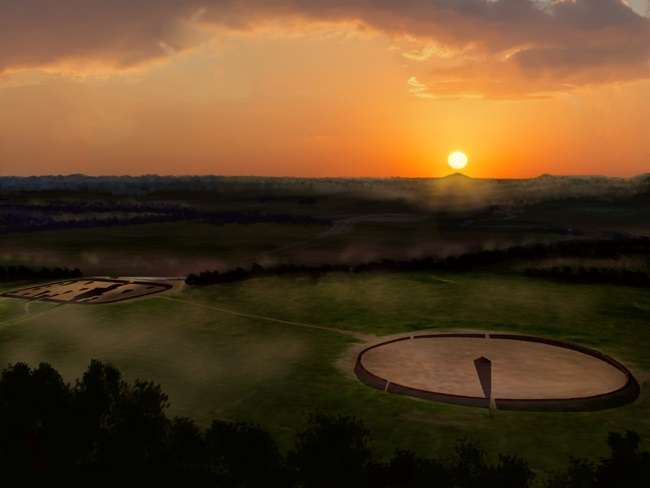
Shriver Circle Earthworks and the Mound City Group (on the left), c. 200 BCE to c. 500 CE, depicted in a 2019 portrait

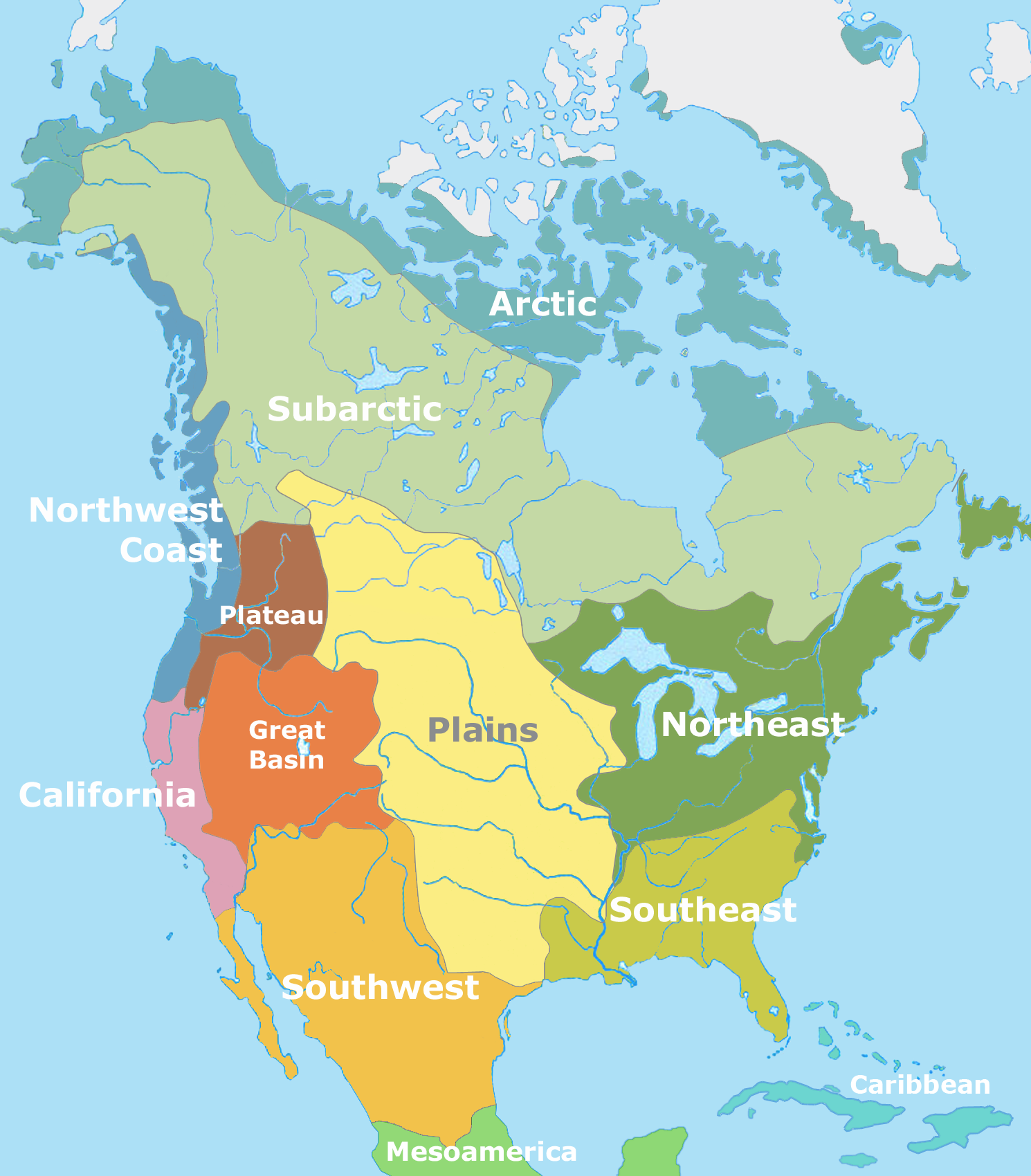
The cultural areas of Indigenous peoples of North America during the Pre-Columbian era, according to anthropologist Alfred Kroeber

The history of Native Americans in the United States began tens of thousands of years ago with the settlement of the Americas by the Paleo-Indians. The Eurasian migration to the Americas occurred over millennia via Beringia, a land bridge between Siberia and Alaska, as early humans spread southward and eastward. Archaeological evidence suggests these migrations began 25,000 years ago and continued until around 12,000 years ago. Some may have arrived even earlier, fishing in kayaks along what is known as the "Kelp Highway". Major Paleo-Indian cultures included the Clovis and Folsom traditions, identified through unique spear points and large-game hunting methods.

Around 8000 BCE, as the climate stabilized, new cultural periods like the Archaic stage arose, during which hunter-gatherer communities developed complex societies. The Mound Builders created large earthworks, such as at Watson Brake and Poverty Point, which date to 3500 BCE and 2200 BCE. By 1000 BCE, Native societies in the Woodland period developed advanced social structures and trade networks, with the Hopewell tradition connecting the Eastern Woodlands to the Great Lakes and the Gulf of Mexico. This period led to the Mississippian culture, with large urban centers like Cahokia—a city with complex mounds and a population exceeding 20,000 by 1250 CE.

Ethnographers classify the Indigenous peoples of North America into ten cultural areas inhabited by groups who share certain cultural traits: the Arctic, Subarctic, Northeastern Woodlands, Southeastern Woodlands, Great Plains, Great Basin, Northwest Plateau, Northwest Coast, California, and Southwest (Oasisamerica). At the time of the first contact, Indigenous cultures varied widely, with some Northeastern and Southwestern groups being matrilineal and organized on collective bases unfamiliar to Europeans. Land was typically held communally, in contrast to European property rights traditions. These differences, compounded by shifting alliances and warfare, generated political tension, ethnic violence, and disruption.

Beginning near the end of the 15th century, migration of Europeans to the Americas led to centuries of population, cultural, and agricultural transfer between Old and New World societies, known as the Columbian exchange. Because most Native groups preserved their histories by means of oral traditions and artwork, the first written accounts of contact were provided by Europeans.

Native Americans suffered high fatality rates from contact with European diseases that were new to them, and to which they had no immunity. Smallpox was especially devastating. Populations in some regions fell by 90 percent or more in the first century after contact. Pre-Columbian population estimates for the area of the modern U.S. range from 2 to over 18 million. By the end of the 18th century, numbers had collapsed to around 600,000 due to disease, warfare, and genocide.

After the thirteen British colonies revolted and established the United States, George Washington and Henry Knox advocated a "civilizing" policy to assimilate Native Americans as U.S. citizens. Assimilation, whether voluntary—as with the Choctaw—or forced, remained a central policy. During the 19th century, the ideology of manifest destiny drove westward expansion, increasing pressure on Native lands. The Indian Removal Act of 1830 authorized mass relocations west of the Mississippi River, resulting in ethnic cleansing and forced marches such as the Trail of Tears.

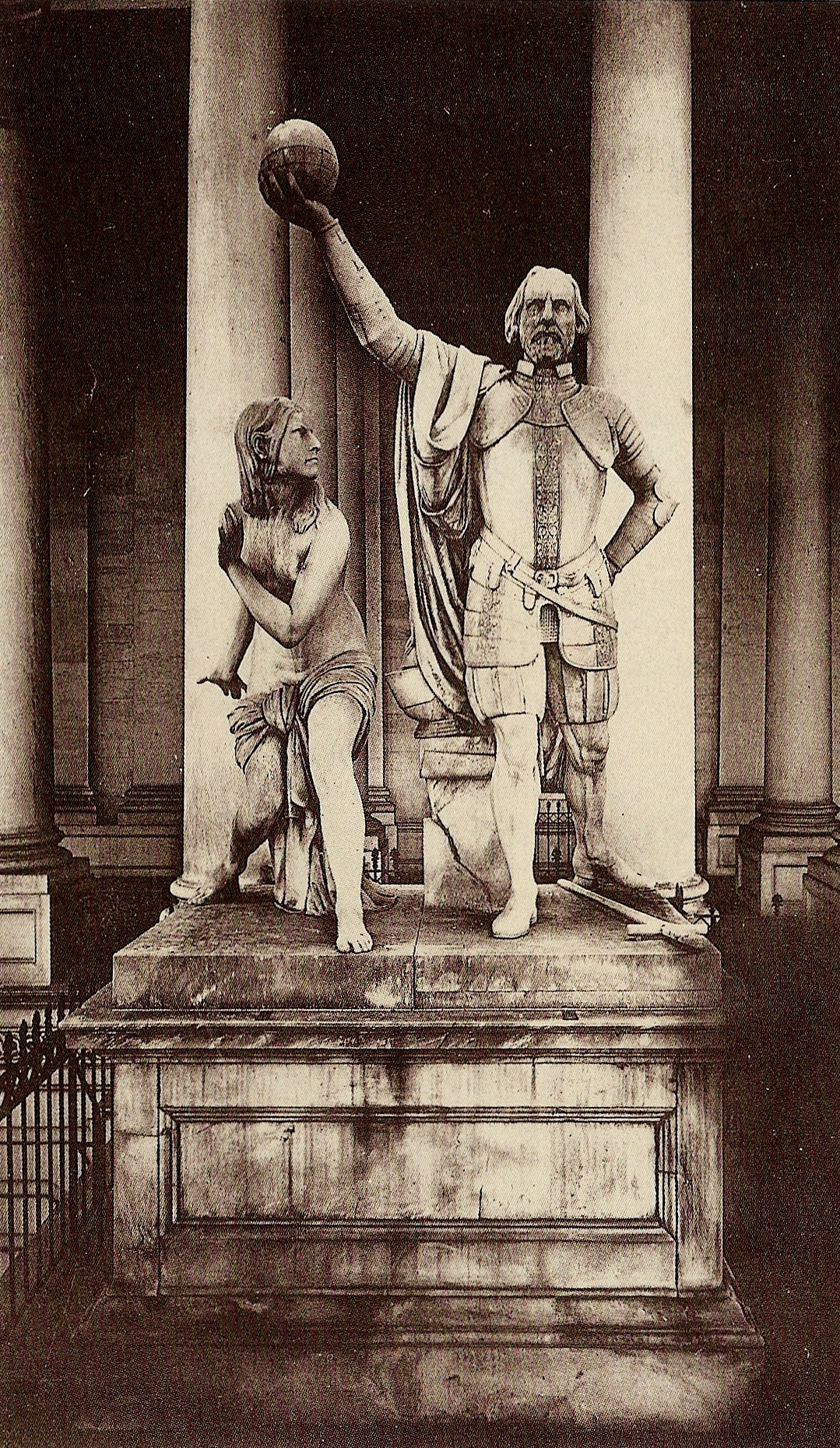
The Discovery of America (1844) sculpture, depicting a triumphant Columbus and a "female savage" (Native woman)

A justification for conquest and subjugation stemmed from dehumanizing stereotypes like those in the United States Declaration of Independence, which described Native Americans as "merciless Indian savages". Two sculptures reflecting this view of the Natives were commissioned by the U.S. government and stood outside the U.S. Capitol for over a century: The Rescue (1837) whose sculptor Horatio Greenough wrote that it was "to convey the idea of the triumph of the whites over the savage tribes", and The Discovery of America (1844) which depicted a triumphant Columbus and a "female savage" according to the Pennsylvania senator James Buchanan who proposed the sculpture.

Native resistance persisted in the American Indian Wars, including the Dakota War of 1862, Great Sioux War of 1876, Snake War, Colorado War, and Texas–Indian Wars. One of the last major events was the Wounded Knee Massacre in 1890, where up to 300 Lakota were killed during a Ghost Dance gathering.

In the 20th century, Native Americans served in significant numbers during World War II, marking a turning point in visibility and involvement. Post-war, activism grew with the American Indian Movement and others pressing for rights. The Indian Self-Determination and Education Assistance Act of 1975 recognized tribal autonomy, leading to Native-run schools and economic initiatives. By the 21st century, Native Americans had achieved greater control over tribal lands and resources, though many communities continue to face the legacies of displacement and economic inequality. Over 70% of Native Americans now live in cities, navigating cultural preservation and ongoing discrimination.

Contemporary Native Americans maintain a unique relationship with the United States, with sovereignty and treaty rights forming the basis of federal Indian law and the trust relationship. Since the late 1960s, cultural activism has expanded Indigenous presence in politics, media, education, and literature. Independent newspapers, television (e.g. First Nations Experience), Native American studies programs, tribal schools, and language revitalization efforts have strengthened cultural identity.

The terms used to refer to Native Americans have been controversial. Usage varies by region and generation, with many older Native Americans preferring "Indian" or "American Indian", while younger generations often choose "Indigenous" or "Aboriginal". The term "Native American" has not traditionally included Native Hawaiians or some Alaska Natives such as Aleut, Yup'ik, or Inuit, while in Canada, First Nations, Inuit, and Métis are the common designations.

== Demographics ==
Proportion of Indigenous Americans (including Native Hawaiians) in each U.S. state, Washington, D.C., and Puerto Rico as of the 2020 U.S. census

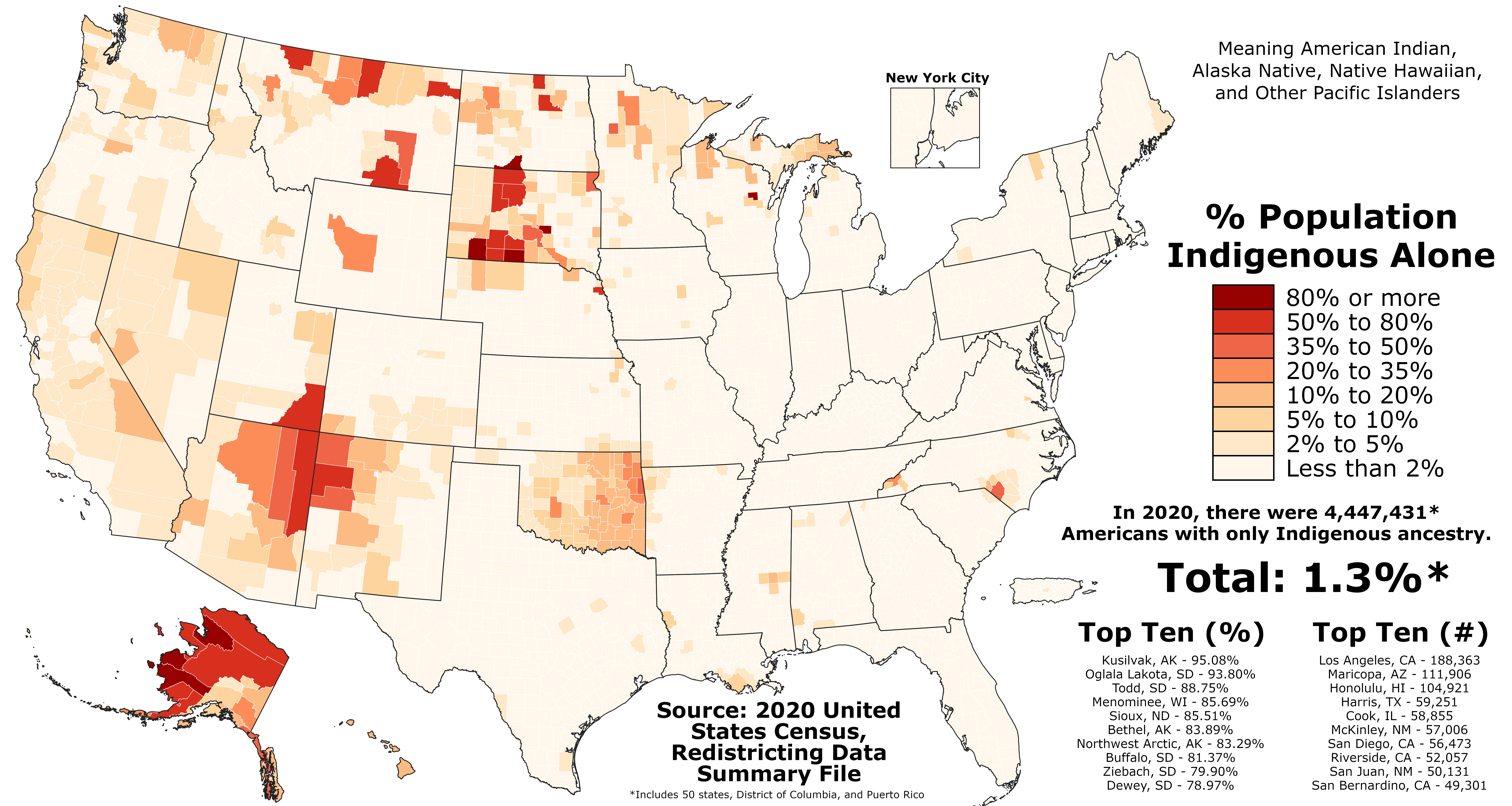
Proportion of Indigenous Americans (Including Native Hawaiians) in each county of the fifty states, Washington, D.C., and Puerto Rico as of the 2020 United States census

The American Indian and Alaskan Native (alone/single race) populations as of 2020.

The 2020 census reports the U.S. population at 331.4 million; of this, 3.7 million people, or 1.1 percent, reported American Indian or Alaska Native ancestry alone. In addition, 5.9 million people (1.8 percent), reported American Indian or Alaska Native in combination with one or more other races.

The definition of American Indian or Alaska Native used in the 2010 census was as follows:

According to Office of Management and Budget, "American Indian or Alaska Native" refers to a person having origins in any of the original peoples of North and South America (including Central America) and who maintains tribal affiliation or community attachment.

Despite generally referring to groups indigenous to the continental US, this demographic as defined by the US Census Bureau includes all Indigenous people of the Americas, including Mesoamerican peoples such as the Maya, as well as Canadian and South American natives. In 2022, 634,503 Indigenous people in the United States identified with Central American Indigenous groups, 875,183 identified with the Indigenous people of Mexico, and 47,518 identified with Canadian First Nations. Of the 3.2 million Americans who identified as American Indian or Alaska Native alone in 2022, around 45% are of Hispanic or Latino ethnicity, with this number growing as increasing numbers of Indigenous people from Latin American countries immigrate to the US and more Latinos self-identify with Indigenous heritage. Of groups Indigenous to the United States, the largest self-reported tribes are Cherokee (1,449,888), Navajo (434,910), Choctaw (295,373), Blackfeet (288,255), Sioux (220,739), and Apache (191,823). 205,954 respondents specified an Alaska Native identity.

Native Hawaiians are counted separately from Native Americans by the census, being classified as Pacific Islanders. According to 2022 estimates, 714,847 Americans reported Native Hawaiian ancestry.

The 2010 census permitted respondents to self-identify as being of one or more races. Self-identification dates from the census of 1960; prior to that the race of the respondent was determined by the opinion of the census taker. The option to select more than one race was introduced in 2000. If American Indian or Alaska Native was selected, the form requested the individual provide the name of the "enrolled or principal tribe".

=== Population since 1880 ===
Censuses counted around 346,000 Native Americans in 1880 (including 33,000 in Alaska and 82,000 in Oklahoma, back then known as Indian Territory), around 274,000 in 1890 (including 25,500 in Alaska and 64,500 in Oklahoma), 362,500 in 1930 and 366,500 in 1940, including those on and off reservations in the 48 states and Alaska. Native American population rebounded sharply from 1950, when they numbered 377,273; it reached 551,669 in 1960, 827,268 in 1970, with an annual growth rate of 5%, four times the national average. Total spending on Native Americans averaged $38 million a year in the late 1920s, dropping to a low of $23 million in 1933, and returning to $38 million in 1940. The Office of Indian Affairs counted more American Indians than the Census Bureau until 1930:

American Indians according to the Census Bureau and the Office of Indian Affairs 1890–1930
Decade	American Indians, Census Bureau	American Indians, Office of Indian Affairs	Alaska Natives
1890	248,253	249,278	25,354
1900	237,196	270,544	29,536
1910	265,683	304,950	25,331
1920	244,437	336,337	26,558
1930	332,397	340,541	29,983

American Indians and Alaska Natives as percentage of the total population between 1880 and 2020:

American Indian and Alaska Native as percentage of population by U.S. state and territory (1880–2020)
State/Territory	1880	1890	1900	1910	1920	1930	1940	1950	1960	1970	1980	1990	2000	2010	2020
Alabama	0.0%	0.1%	0.0%	0.0%	0.0%	0.0%	0.0%	0.0%	0.0%	0.1%	0.2%	0.4%	0.5%	0.6%	0.7%
Alaska	98.7%	79.1%	46.5%	39.4%	48.3%	50.6%	44.8%	26.3%	19.1%	16.8%	16.0%	15.6%	15.6%	14.8%	21.9%
Arizona	37.5%	34.0%	21.5%	14.3%	9.9%	10.0%	11.0%	8.8%	6.4%	5.4%	5.6%	5.6%	5.0%	4.6%	6.3%
Arkansas	0.0%	0.0%	0.0%	0.0%	0.0%	0.0%	0.0%	0.0%	0.0%	0.1%	0.4%	0.5%	0.7%	0.8%	0.9%
California	2.4%	1.4%	1.0%	0.7%	0.5%	0.3%	0.3%	0.2%	0.2%	0.5%	0.9%	0.8%	1.0%	1.0%	1.6%
Colorado	1.4%	0.3%	0.3%	0.2%	0.1%	0.1%	0.1%	0.1%	0.2%	0.4%	0.6%	0.8%	1.0%	1.1%	1.3%
Connecticut	0.0%	0.0%	0.0%	0.0%	0.0%	0.0%	0.0%	0.0%	0.0%	0.1%	0.1%	0.2%	0.3%	0.3%	0.4%
Delaware	0.0%	0.0%	0.0%	0.0%	0.0%	0.0%	0.0%	0.0%	0.1%	0.1%	0.2%	0.3%	0.3%	0.5%	0.5%
Florida	0.3%	0.0%	0.1%	0.0%	0.1%	0.0%	0.0%	0.0%	0.1%	0.1%	0.2%	0.3%	0.3%	0.4%	0.4%
(Georgia (U.S. state)) Georgia	0.0%	0.0%	0.0%	0.0%	0.0%	0.0%	0.0%	0.0%	0.0%	0.1%	0.1%	0.2%	0.3%	0.3%	0.5%
Hawaii	0.0%	0.0%	0.0%	0.0%	0.0%	0.0%	0.0%	0.0%	0.1%	0.1%	0.3%	0.5%	0.3%	0.3%	0.3%
Idaho	10.0%	4.8%	2.6%	1.1%	0.7%	0.8%	0.7%	0.6%	0.8%	0.9%	1.1%	1.4%	1.4%	1.4%	1.4%
Illinois	0.0%	0.0%	0.0%	0.0%	0.0%	0.0%	0.0%	0.0%	0.0%	0.1%	0.1%	0.2%	0.2%	0.3%	0.8%
Indiana	0.0%	0.0%	0.0%	0.0%	0.0%	0.0%	0.0%	0.0%	0.0%	0.1%	0.1%	0.2%	0.3%	0.3%	0.4%
Iowa	0.1%	0.0%	0.0%	0.0%	0.0%	0.0%	0.0%	0.0%	0.1%	0.1%	0.2%	0.3%	0.3%	0.4%	0.5%
Kansas	0.2%	0.1%	0.1%	0.1%	0.1%	0.1%	0.1%	0.1%	0.2%	0.4%	0.7%	0.9%	0.9%	1.0%	1.1%
Kentucky	0.0%	0.0%	0.0%	0.0%	0.0%	0.0%	0.0%	0.0%	0.0%	0.0%	0.1%	0.2%	0.2%	0.2%	0.3%
Louisiana	0.1%	0.1%	0.0%	0.0%	0.1%	0.1%	0.1%	0.0%	0.1%	0.1%	0.3%	0.4%	0.6%	0.7%	0.7%
Maine	0.1%	0.1%	0.1%	0.1%	0.1%	0.1%	0.1%	0.2%	0.2%	0.2%	0.4%	0.5%	0.6%	0.6%	0.6%
Maryland	0.0%	0.0%	0.0%	0.0%	0.0%	0.0%	0.0%	0.0%	0.0%	0.1%	0.2%	0.3%	0.3%	0.4%	0.5%
Massachusetts	0.0%	0.0%	0.0%	0.0%	0.0%	0.0%	0.0%	0.0%	0.0%	0.1%	0.1%	0.2%	0.2%	0.3%	0.3%
Michigan	1.1%	0.3%	0.3%	0.3%	0.2%	0.1%	0.1%	0.1%	0.1%	0.2%	0.4%	0.6%	0.6%	0.6%	0.6%
Minnesota	1.1%	0.8%	0.5%	0.4%	0.4%	0.4%	0.4%	0.4%	0.5%	0.6%	0.9%	1.1%	1.1%	1.1%	1.2%
Mississippi	0.2%	0.2%	0.1%	0.1%	0.1%	0.1%	0.1%	0.1%	0.1%	0.2%	0.2%	0.3%	0.4%	0.5%	0.6%
Missouri	0.0%	0.0%	0.0%	0.0%	0.0%	0.0%	0.0%	0.0%	0.0%	0.1%	0.3%	0.4%	0.4%	0.5%	0.5%
Montana	38.3%	7.8%	4.7%	0.8%	2.0%	2.8%	3.0%	2.8%	3.1%	3.9%	4.7%	6.0%	6.2%	6.3%	9.3%
Nebraska	1.0%	0.6%	0.3%	0.3%	0.2%	0.2%	0.3%	0.3%	0.4%	0.4%	0.6%	0.8%	0.9%	1.2%	1.2%
Nevada	13.9%	10.9%	12.3%	6.4%	6.3%	5.3%	4.3%	3.1%	2.3%	1.6%	1.7%	1.6%	1.3%	1.2%	1.4%
New Hampshire	0.0%	0.0%	0.0%	0.0%	0.0%	0.0%	0.0%	0.0%	0.0%	0.0%	0.1%	0.2%	0.2%	0.2%	0.2%
New Jersey	0.0%	0.0%	0.0%	0.0%	0.0%	0.0%	0.0%	0.0%	0.0%	0.1%	0.1%	0.2%	0.2%	0.3%	0.6%
New Mexico	23.2%	9.4%	6.7%	6.3%	5.4%	6.8%	6.5%	6.2%	5.9%	7.2%	8.1%	8.9%	9.5%	9.4%	12.4%
(New York (state)) New York	0.1%	0.1%	0.1%	0.1%	0.1%	0.1%	0.1%	0.1%	0.1%	0.2%	0.2%	0.3%	0.4%	0.6%	0.7%
North Carolina	0.1%	0.1%	0.3%	0.4%	0.5%	0.5%	0.6%	0.1%	0.8%	0.9%	1.1%	1.2%	1.2%	1.3%	1.2%
North Dakota	13.0%	4.3%	2.2%	1.1%	1.0%	1.2%	1.6%	1.7%	1.9%	2.3%	3.1%	4.1%	4.9%	5.4%	7.2%
Ohio	0.0%	0.0%	0.0%	0.0%	0.0%	0.0%	0.0%	0.0%	0.0%	0.1%	0.1%	0.2%	0.2%	0.2%	0.3%
Oklahoma	100.0%	24.9%	8.2%	4.5%	2.8%	3.9%	2.7%	2.4%	2.8%	3.8%	5.6%	8.0%	7.9%	8.6%	16.0%
Oregon	3.5%	1.6%	1.2%	0.8%	0.6%	0.5%	0.4%	0.4%	0.5%	0.6%	1.0%	1.4%	1.3%	1.4%	4.4%
Pennsylvania	0.0%	0.0%	0.0%	0.0%	0.0%	0.0%	0.0%	0.0%	0.0%	0.0%	0.1%	0.1%	0.1%	0.2%	0.2%
Rhode Island	0.0%	0.1%	0.0%	0.1%	0.0%	0.0%	0.0%	0.0%	0.1%	0.1%	0.3%	0.4%	0.5%	0.6%	0.7%
South Carolina	0.0%	0.0%	0.0%	0.0%	0.0%	0.1%	0.1%	0.1%	0.1%	0.1%	0.2%	0.2%	0.3%	0.4%	0.5%
South Dakota	20.6%	5.7%	5.0%	3.3%	2.6%	3.2%	3.6%	3.6%	3.8%	4.9%	6.5%	7.3%	8.3%	8.8%	11.1%
Tennessee	0.0%	0.0%	0.0%	0.0%	0.0%	0.0%	0.0%	0.0%	0.0%	0.1%	0.1%	0.2%	0.3%	0.3%	0.4%
Texas	0.1%	0.0%	0.0%	0.0%	0.0%	0.0%	0.0%	0.0%	0.1%	0.2%	0.3%	0.4%	0.6%	0.7%	1.0%
Utah	0.9%	1.6%	0.9%	0.8%	0.6%	0.6%	0.7%	0.6%	0.8%	1.1%	1.3%	1.4%	1.3%	1.2%	1.3%
Vermont	0.0%	0.0%	0.0%	0.0%	0.0%	0.0%	0.0%	0.0%	0.0%	0.1%	0.2%	0.3%	0.4%	0.4%	0.4%
Virginia	0.0%	0.0%	0.0%	0.0%	0.0%	0.0%	0.0%	0.0%	0.1%	0.1%	0.2%	0.2%	0.3%	0.4%	0.5%
(Washington (state)) Washington	20.8%	3.1%	1.9%	1.0%	0.7%	0.7%	0.7%	0.6%	0.7%	1.0%	1.5%	1.7%	1.6%	1.5%	4.1%
West Virginia	0.0%	0.0%	0.0%	0.0%	0.0%	0.0%	0.0%	0.0%	0.0%	0.0%	0.1%	0.1%	0.2%	0.2%	0.2%
Wisconsin	0.8%	0.6%	0.4%	0.4%	0.4%	0.4%	0.4%	0.4%	0.4%	0.4%	0.6%	0.8%	0.9%	1.0%	1.0%
Wyoming	9.6%	2.9%	1.8%	1.0%	0.7%	0.8%	0.9%	1.1%	1.2%	1.5%	1.5%	2.1%	2.3%	2.4%	4.8%
(Washington, D.C.) Washington, D.C.	0.0%	0.0%	0.0%	0.0%	0.0%	0.0%	0.0%	0.0%	0.1%	0.1%	0.2%	0.2%	0.3%	0.3%	0.5%
Puerto Rico													0.4%	0.5%	0.5%
United States	0.7%	0.4%	0.3%	0.3%	0.2%	0.3%	0.3%	0.2%	0.3%	0.4%	0.6%	0.8%	0.9%	0.9%	1.1%

Absolute numbers of American Indians and Alaska Natives between 1880 and 2020 (since 1890 according to the Census Bureau):

American Indian and Alaska Native population by U.S. state and territory (1880–2020)
State/Territory	1880	1890	1900	1910	1920	1930	1940	1950	1960	1970	1980	1990	2000	2010	2020
Alabama	213	1,143	177	909	405	465	464	928	1,276	2,443	9,239	16,506	22,430	28,218	33,625
Alaska	32,996	25,354	29,536	25,331	26,558	29,983	32,458	33,863	42,522	50,814	64,103	85,698	98,043	104,871	111,575
Arizona	22,199	29,981	26,480	29,201	32,989	43,726	55,076	65,761	83,387	95,812	154,175	203,527	255,879	296,529	319,512
Arkansas	195	250	66	460	106	408	278	533	580	2,014	12,713	12,773	17,808	22,248	27,177
California	20,385	16,624	15,377	16,371	17,360	19,212	18,675	19,947	39,014	91,018	227,757	242,164	333,346	362,801	631,016
Colorado	2,684	1,092	1,437	1,482	1,383	1,395	1,360	1,567	4,288	8,836	20,682	27,776	44,241	56,010	74,129
Connecticut	255	228	153	152	159	162	201	333	923	2,222	4,822	6,654	9,639	11,256	16,051
Delaware	5	4	9	5	2	5	14	0	597	656	1,380	2,019	2,731	4,181	5,148
Florida	780 (Note: In Florida in 1880 there were reported 180 taxed Indians and 600 inhabitants of unknown race, possibly also Indians.)	171	358	74	518	587	690	1,011	2,504	6,677	24,714	36,335	53,541	71,458	94,795
(Georgia (U.S. state)) Georgia	124	68	19	95	125	43	106	333	749	2,347	9,876	13,348	21,737	32,151	50,618
Hawaii	0	0	0	0	0	0	0	0	472	1,126	2,833	5,099	3,535	4,164	4,370
Idaho	3,585	4,223	4,226	3,488	3,098	3,638	3,537	3,800	5,231	6,687	10,405	13,780	17,645	21,441	25,621
Illinois	140	98	16	188	194	469	624	1,443	4,704	11,413	19,118	21,836	31,006	43,963	96,498
Indiana	246	343	243	279	125	285	223	438	948	3,887	9,495	12,720	15,815	18,462	26,086
Iowa	821	457	382	471	529	660	733	1,084	1,708	2,992	6,311	7,349	8,989	11,084	14,486
Kansas	1,499	1,682	2,130	2,444	2,276	2,454	1,165	2,381	5,069	8,672	17,829	21,965	24,936	28,150	30,995
Kentucky	50	71	102	234	57	22	44	234	391	1,531	4,497	5,769	8,616	10,120	12,801
Louisiana	848	628	593	780	1,069	1,536	1,801	409	3,587	5,294	12,841	18,541	25,477	30,579	31,657
Maine	625	559	798	892	830	1,012	1,251	1,522	1,879	2,195	4,360	5,998	7,098	8,568	7,885
Maryland	15	44	3	55	32	50	73	314	1,538	4,239	8,946	12,972	15,423	20,420	31,845
Massachusetts	369	428	587	688	555	874	769	1,201	2,118	4,475	8,996	12,241	15,015	18,850	24,018
Michigan	17,390	5,625	6,354	7,519	5,614	7,080	6,282	7,000	9,701	16,854	44,712	55,638	58,479	62,007	61,261
Minnesota	8,498	10,096	9,182	9,053	8,761	11,077	12,528	12,533	15,496	23,128	36,527	49,909	54,967	60,916	68,641
Mississippi	1,857	2,036	2,203	1,253	1,105	1,458	2,134	2,502	3,119	4,113	6,836	8,525	11,652	15,030	16,450
Missouri	113	128	130	313	171	578	330	547	1,723	5,405	14,820	19,835	25,076	27,376	30,518
Montana	23,313	11,206	11,343	10,745	10,956	14,798	16,841	16,606	21,181	27,130	37,623	47,679	56,068	62,555	67,612
Nebraska	4,541	6,431	3,322	3,502	2,888	3,256	3,401	3,954	5,545	6,624	9,059	12,410	14,896	18,427	23,102
Nevada	9,603	5,156	5,216	5,240	4,907	4,871	4,747	5,025	6,681	7,933	14,256	19,637	26,420	32,062	43,932
New Hampshire	63	16	22	34	28	64	50	74	135	361	1,342	2,134	2,964	3,150	3,031
New Jersey	74	84	63	168	106	213	211	621	1,699	4,706	10,028	14,970	19,492	29,026	51,186
New Mexico	33,224	15,044	13,144	20,573	19,512	28,941	34,510	41,901	56,255	72,788	106,585	134355	173,483	193,222	212,241
(New York (state)) New York	5,958	6,044	5,257	6,046	5,503	6,973	8,651	10,640	16,491	28,355	43,508	62,651	82,461	106,906	149,690
North Carolina	1,230	1,516	5,687	7,851	11,824	16,579	22,546	3,742	38,129	44,406	65,808	80,155	99,551	122,110	130,032
North Dakota	8,329	8,174	6,968	6,486	6,254	8,387	10,114	10,766	11,736	14,369	19,905	25,917	31,329	36,591	38,914
Ohio	130	206	42	127	151	435	338	1,146	1,910	6,654	15,300	20,358	24,486	25,292	30,720
Oklahoma	82,334 (Note: For Oklahoma one count reported 76,585 Indians in 1880 (including 59,187 in Five Civilized Tribes), another count reported 79,769 or 79,469 (including 64,000 in Five Civilized Tribes) and yet another reported 82,334 (including 64,000 in Five Civilized Tribes) as of 1884.)	64,456	64,445	74,825	57,337	92,725	63,125	53,769	64,689	98,468	171,092	252,420	273,230	321,687	332,791
Oregon	6,249	4,971	4,951	5,090	4,590	4,776	4,594	5,820	8,026	13,510	29,783	38,496	45,211	53,203	62,993
Pennsylvania	184	1,081	1,639	1,503	337	523	441	1,141	2,122	5,533	10,928	14,733	18,348	26,843	31,052
Rhode Island	77	180	35	284	110	318	196	385	932	1,390	3,186	4,071	5,121	6,058	7,385
South Carolina	131	173	121	331	304	959	1,234	554	1,098	2,241	6,655	8,246	13,718	19,524	24,303
South Dakota	20,230	19,854	20225	19,137	16,384	21,833	23,347	23,344	25,794	32,365	45,525	50,575	62,283	71,817	77,748
Tennessee	352	146	108	216	56	161	114	339	638	2,276	6,946	10,039	15,152	19,994	28,044
Texas	992	708	470	702	2,109	1,001	1,103	2,736	5,750	17,957	50,296	65,877	118,362	170,972	278,948
Utah	1,257	3,456	2,623	3,123	2,711	2,869	3,611	4,201	6,961	11,273	19,994	24,283	29,684	32,927	41,644
Vermont	11	34	5	26	24	36	16	30	57	229	1,041	1,696	2,420	2,207	2,289
Virginia	85	349	354	539	824	779	198	1,056	2,155	4,853	9,867	15,282	21,172	29,225	40,007
(Washington (state)) Washington	18,594	11,181	10,039	10,997	9,061	11,253	11,394	13,816	21,076	33,386	61,233	81,483	93,301	103,869	121,468
West Virginia	29	9	12	36	7	18	25	160	181	751	2,317	2,458	3,606	3,787	3,706
Wisconsin	10,798	9,930	8,372	10,142	9,611	11,548	12,265	12,196	14,297	18,924	30,553	39,387	47,228	54,526	60,428
Wyoming	2,203	1,844	1,686	1,486	1,343	1,845	2,349	3,237	4,020	4,980	8,192	9,479	11,133	13,336	13,898
(Washington, D.C.) Washington, D.C.	5	25	22	68	37	40	190	330	587	956	986	1,466	1,713	2,079	3,193
United States	345,888	273,607	266,732	291,014	270,995	362,380	366,427	377,273	551,669	827,268	1,519,995	1,959,234	2,475,956	2,932,248	3,727,135
Non-Hispanic	345,888	273,607	266,732	291,014	270,995	362,380	366,427	377,273	551,669	800,409	1,425,250	1,793,773	2,068,883	2,247,098	2,251,699

=== Population distribution ===
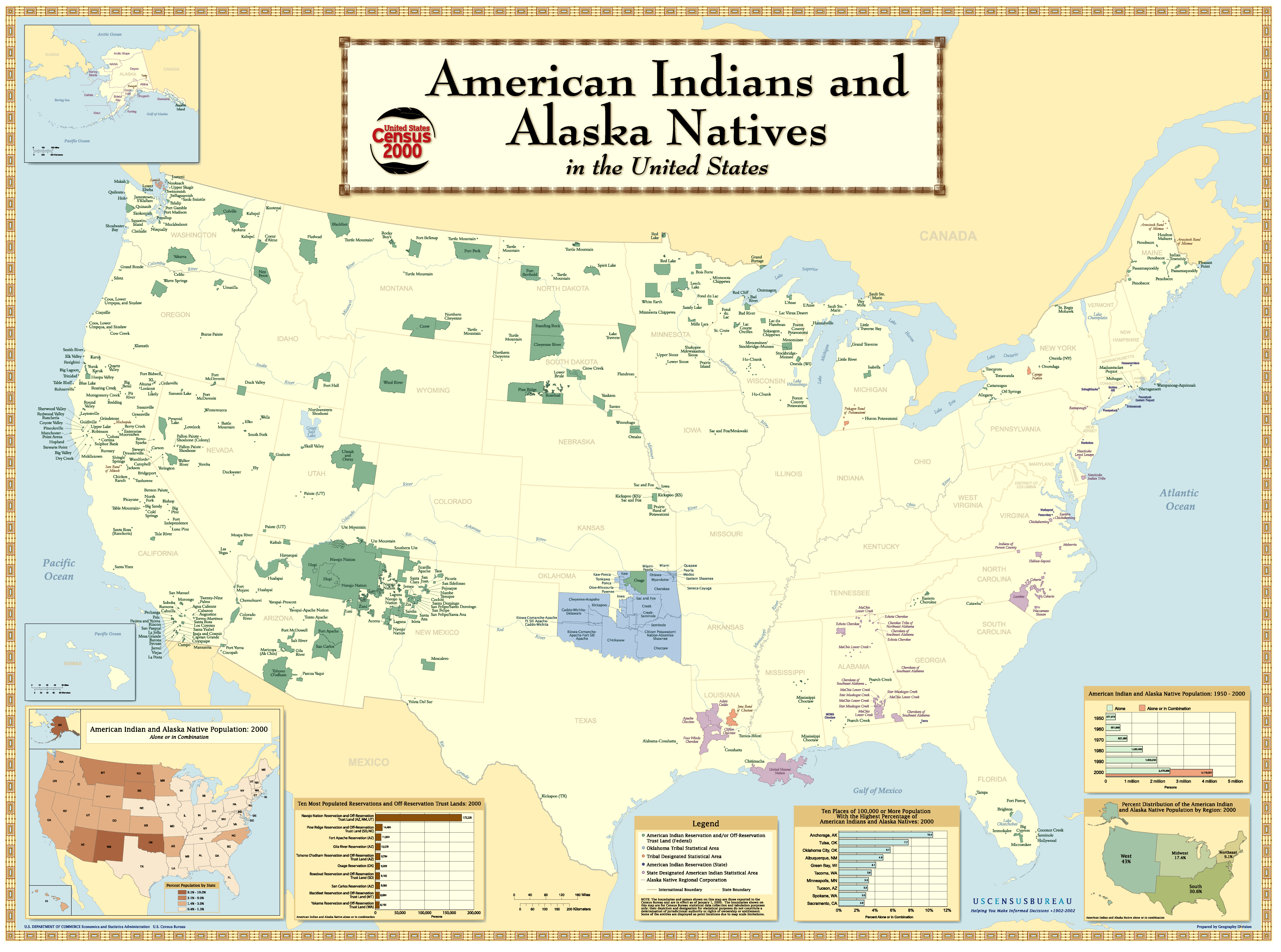
This U.S. Census Bureau map depicts the locations of differing Native American groups, including Indian reservations, as of 2000; present-day Oklahoma in the Southwestern United States, which was once designated as an Indian Territory before Oklahoma's statehood in 1907, is highlighted in blue.

78% of Native Americans live outside a reservation. Mono-racial individuals are more likely to live on a reservation than multiracial individuals. The Navajo, with 286,000 mono-racial individuals, is the largest tribe if only non-multiracial individuals are counted; the Navajo are the tribe with the highest proportion of mono-racial individuals, 86.3%. The Cherokee have a different history; it is the largest tribe, with 819,000 individuals multiracial, and it has 284,000 mono-racial individuals.

==== Urban migration ====
As of 2012, 70% of Native Americans live in urban areas, up from 45% in 1970 and 8% in 1940. Urban areas with significant Native American populations include Minneapolis, Denver, Phoenix, Tucson, Chicago, Oklahoma City, Houston, New York City, and Los Angeles. Many live in poverty. Racism, unemployment, drugs and gangs are common problems which Indian social service organizations such as the Little Earth housing complex in Minneapolis attempt to address.

=== Population by tribal grouping ===
Below are numbers for U.S. citizens self-identifying to selected tribal groupings, according to the 2010 U.S. census.

2010 Native American distribution by tribal group
Tribal grouping	Tribal flag	Tribal seal	American Indian & Alaska Native Alone one tribal grouping reported	American Indian & Alaska Native Alone more than one tribal grouping reported	American Indian & Alaska Native Mixed one tribal grouping reported	American Indian & Alaska Native Mixed more than one tribal grouping reported	American Indian & Alaska Native tribal grouping alone or mixed in any combination
Total			2,879,638	52,610	2,209,267	79,064	5,220,579
Apache			63,193	6,501	33,303	8,813	111,810
Arapaho			8,014	388	2,084	375	10,861
Blackfeet			27,279	4,519	54,109	19,397	105,304
Canadian & French American Indian			6,433	618	6,981	790	14,822
Central American Indian			15,882	572	10,865	525	27,844
Cherokee			284,247	16,216	468,082	50,560	819,105
Cheyenne (Northern and Southern)			11,375	1,118	5,311	1,247	19,051
Chickasaw			27,973	2,233	19,220	2,852	52,278
Choctaw			103,910	6,398	72,101	13,355	195,764
Colville			8,114	200	2,148	87	10,549
Comanche			12,284	1,187	8,131	1,728	23,330
Cree			2,211	739	4,023	1,010	7,983
Creek			48,352	4,596	30,618	4,766	88,332
Crow			10,332	528	3,309	1,034	15,203
Delaware (Lenape)			7,843	372	9,439	610	18,264
Hopi			12,580	2,054	3,013	680	18,327
Houma			8,169	71	2,438	90	10,768
Haudenosaunee			40,570	1,891	34,490	4,051	81,002
Kiowa			9,437	918	2,947	485	13,787
Lumbee			62,306	651	10,039	695	73,691
Menominee			8,374	253	2,330	176	11,133
Mexican American Indian			121,221	2,329	49,670	2,274	175,494
Navajo			286,731	8,285	32,918	4,195	332,129
Ojibwe			112,757	2,645	52,091	3,249	170,742
Osage			8,938	1,125	7,090	1,423	18,576
Ottawa			7,272	776	4,274	711	13,033
Paiute			9,340	865	3,135	427	13,767
Pima			22,040	1,165	3,116	334	26,655
Potawatomi			20,412	462	12,249	648	33,771
Pueblo			49,695	2,331	9,568	946	62,540
Puget Sound Salish			14,320	215	5,540	185	20,260
Seminole			14,080	2,368	12,447	3,076	31,971
Shoshone			7,852	610	3,969	571	13,002
Sioux			112,176	4,301	46,964	6,669	170,110
South American Indian			20,901	479	25,015	838	47,233
Spanish American Indian			13,460	298	6,012	181	19,951
Tohono O'odham			19,522	725	3,033	198	23,478
Ute			7,435	785	2,802	469	11,491
Yakama			8,786	310	2,207	224	11,527
Yaqui			21,679	1,516	8,183	1,217	32,595
Yuman			7,727	551	1,642	169	10,089
All other American Indian tribes			270,141	12,606	135,032	11,850	429,629
American Indian tribes, not specified			131,943	117	102,188	72	234,320
Alaska Native tribes, specified			98,892	4,194	32,992	2,772	138,850
Alaskan Athabaskans			15,623	804	5,531	526	22,484
Aleut			11,920	723	6,108	531	19,282
Inupiat			24,859	877	7,051	573	33,360
Tlingit-Haida			15,256	859	9,331	634	26,080
Tsimshian			2,307	240	1,010	198	3,755
Yup'ik			28,927	691	3,961	310	33,889
Alaska Native tribes, not specified			19,731	173	9,896	133	29,933
American Indian or Alaska Native tribes, not specified			693,709	no data	852,253	1	1,545,963

== Tribal sovereignty ==
Indian reservations

There are 574 federally recognized tribal governments and 326 Indian reservations in the US. These tribes possess the right to form their own governments, enforce laws (civil and criminal) within their lands, tax, establish requirements for membership, license and regulate activities, zone, and exclude persons from tribal territories. Limitations on self-government include the same applicable to states; for example, neither have the power to make war, engage in foreign relations, or mint currency. Some tribes are recognized by individual states, but not by the federal government. The rights and benefits associated with state recognition vary from state to state.

Many Native Americans and advocates their rights note the federal government's claim to recognize the "sovereignty" of Native American peoples falls short, given the US wishes to govern Native American peoples and treat them as subject to US law. Such advocates contend that full respect for Native American sovereignty would require the US government to deal with Native American peoples in the same manner as other sovereign nations, handling matters related to Native Americans through the Secretary of State, rather than the Bureau of Indian Affairs. The Bureau of Indian Affairs states that its "responsibility is the administration and management of 55,700,000 acres (225,000 km^{2}) of land held in trust by the United States for American Indians, Indian tribes, and Alaska Natives". Many Native Americans and advocates of their rights believe it is condescending for such lands to be considered "held in trust" and regulated in any fashion by any entity other than the tribes.

Some tribes have been unable to document the continuity required for federal recognition, and its benefits. Tribes must prove continuous existence since 1900. The federal government has maintained this requirement, in part because through participation on councils and committees, federally-recognized tribes have been adamant about groups' satisfying the same requirements as they did. The Muwekma Ohlone of the San Francisco Bay Area are pursuing litigation in the federal court system to establish recognition. Many smaller eastern tribes, long considered remnants of extinct peoples, have been trying to gain recognition of their tribal status. Several tribes in Virginia and North Carolina have gained state recognition. Federal recognition confers benefits, including the right to label arts and crafts as Native American and permission to apply for grants specifically reserved for Native Americans. But gaining recognition as a tribe is difficult; to be established as a tribal group, members have to submit extensive genealogical proof of tribal descent and continuity of the tribe as a culture.

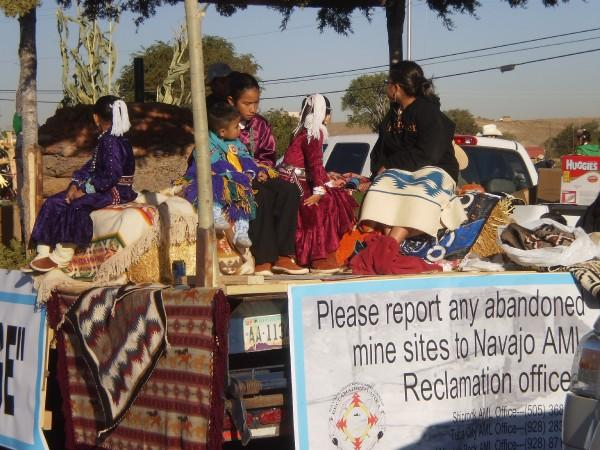
Native peoples are concerned about the effects of abandoned uranium mines on or near their lands.

In 2000, the Washington State Republican Party adopted a resolution recommending federal and legislative branches of the U.S. government terminate tribal governments. In 2007, a group of Democratic Party congressmen and congresswomen introduced a bill in the U.S. House of Representatives to terminate federal recognition of the Cherokee Nation. This was related to their voting to exclude Cherokee Freedmen as members of the tribe unless they had a Cherokee ancestor on the Dawes Rolls, although all Cherokee Freedmen and their descendants had been members since 1866.

The State of Maine is the only State House Legislature that allows Representatives from Indian Tribes. The three nonvoting members represent the Penobscot Nation, Houlton Band of Maliseet Indians, and Passamaquoddy Tribe. These representatives can sponsor any legislation regarding American Indian affairs or co-sponsor pending legislation. Maine is unique regarding Indigenous leadership representation.

In the state of Virginia, Native Americans face a unique problem. Until 2017 Virginia had no federally recognized tribes but the state had recognized eight. This is related historically to the greater impact of disease and warfare on the Virginia Indian populations, as well as intermarriage with Europeans and Africans. Some confused ancestry with culture, but groups of Virginia Indians maintained their cultural continuity. Most of their early reservations were ended under the pressure of early European settlement. Historians note the problems of Virginia Indians in establishing continuity of identity, were due to Walter Ashby Plecker (1912–46). As registrar of the state's Bureau of Vital Statistics, he applied his interpretation of the one-drop rule, enacted in 1924, as the state's Racial Integrity Act. It recognized only two races: "white" and "colored". Plecker, a segregationist, believed the state's Native Americans had been "mongrelized" by intermarriage with African Americans; to him, ancestry determined identity, rather than culture. He thought some of partial black ancestry were trying to "pass" as Native Americans. Plecker thought anyone with African heritage had to be classified as colored. Plecker pressured local governments into reclassifying all Native Americans as "colored" and gave them lists of surnames to examine for reclassification based on his interpretations. This led to the state's destruction of accurate records related to families and communities who identified as Native American. By his actions, sometimes members of the same family were split by being classified as "white" or "colored". He did not allow people to enter their primary identification as Native American in state records. In 2009, the Senate Indian Affairs Committee endorsed a bill that would grant federal recognition to tribes in Virginia.

As of 2000, the largest groups in the US by population were Navajo, Cherokee, Choctaw, Sioux, Ojibwe, Apache, Blackfeet, Haudenosaunee, and Pueblo. In 2000, eight of ten Americans with Native American ancestry were of mixed ancestry. It is estimated that by 2100 that figure will rise to nine out of ten.

Native Americans are wary of attempts by others to gain control of their reservation lands for natural resources, such as coal and uranium in the West.

== Civil rights movement ==
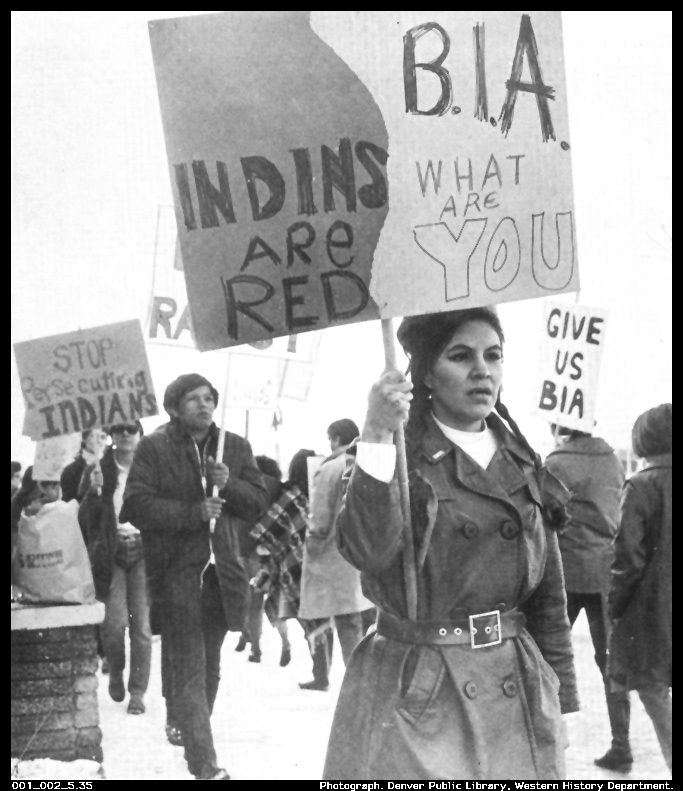
National Indian Youth Council demonstrations, March 1970, Bureau of Indian Affairs Office

The civil rights movement was significant for the rights of Native Americans and other people of color. Native Americans faced racism and prejudice for hundreds of years, and this increased after the American Civil War. Native Americans, like African Americans, were subjected to the Jim Crow Laws and segregation in the Deep South especially after they were made citizens through the Indian Citizenship Act of 1924. As a body of law, Jim Crow institutionalized economic, educational, and social disadvantages for Native Americans, and other people of color living in the south. Native American identity was especially targeted by a system that only wanted to recognize white or colored, and the government began to question the legitimacy of some tribes because they had intermarried with African Americans. Native Americans were also discriminated and discouraged from voting in the southern and western states.

In the south, segregation was a major problem for Native Americans seeking education, but the NAACP's legal strategy would later change this. Movements such as Brown v. Board of Education was a major victory for the Civil Rights Movement headed by the NAACP, and inspired Native Americans to start participating in the Civil Rights Movement. Martin Luther King Jr. began assisting Native Americans in the south in the late 1950s after they reached out to him. At that time the remaining Creek in Alabama were trying to completely desegregate schools in their area. In this case, light-complexioned Native children were allowed to ride school buses to previously all white schools, while dark-skinned Native children from the same band were barred from riding the same buses. Tribal leaders, upon hearing of King's desegregation campaign in Birmingham, Alabama, contacted him for assistance. Through King's intervention, the problem was quickly resolved. King later traveled to Arizona visiting Native Americans on reservations, and in churches encouraging them to be involved in the Civil Rights Movement. In King's book Why We Can't Wait he writes:

Our nation was born in genocide when it embraced the doctrine that the original American, the Indian, was an inferior race. Even before there were large numbers of Negroes on our shores, the scar of racial hatred had already disfigured colonial society. From the sixteenth century forward, blood flowed in battles over racial supremacy. We are perhaps the only nation which tried as a matter of national policy to wipe out its Indigenous population. Moreover, we elevated that tragic experience into a noble crusade. Indeed, even today we have not permitted ourselves to reject or to feel remorse for this shameful episode. Our literature, our films, our drama, our folklore all exalt it.

Native Americans then actively participated and supported the NAACP, and the civil rights movement. The National Indian Youth Council (NIYC) would soon rise in 1961 to fight for Native American rights during the Civil Rights Movement, and were strong King supporters. During the 1963 March on Washington there was a sizable Native American contingent, including many from South Dakota, and many from the Navajo nation. Native Americans also participated the Poor People's Campaign in 1968. The NIYC were very active supporters of the Poor People's Campaign unlike the National Congress of American Indians (NCAI); the NIYC and other Native organizations met with King in March 1968 but the NCAI disagreed on how to approach the anti-poverty campaign; the NCAI decided against participating in the march. The NCAI wished to pursue their battles in the courts and with Congress, unlike the NIYC. The NAACP also inspired the creation of the Native American Rights Fund (NARF) which was patterned after the NAACP's Legal Defense and Education Fund. Furthermore, the NAACP continued to organize to stop mass incarceration and end the criminalization of Native Americans and other communities of people of color. The following is an excerpt from a statement from Mel Thom on May 1, 1968, during a meeting with Secretary of State Dean Rusk: (It was written by members of the Workshop on American Indian Affairs and the NIYC)

We have joined the Poor People's Campaign because most of our families, tribes, and communities number among those suffering most in this country. We are not begging. We are demanding what is rightfully ours. This is no more than the right to have a decent life in our own communities. We need guaranteed jobs, guaranteed income, housing, schools, economic development, but most important- we want them on our own terms. Our chief spokesman in the federal government, the Department of Interior, has failed us. In fact it began failing us from its very beginning. The Interior Department began failing us because it was built upon and operates under a racist, immoral, paternalistic and colonialistic system. There is no way to improve upon racism, immorality and colonialism; it can only be done away with. The system and power structure serving Indian peoples is a sickness which has grown to epidemic proportions. The Indian system is sick. Paternalism is the virus and the secretary of the Interior is the carrier.

== Contemporary issues ==
Native American struggles amid reservation poverty to maintain life on the reservation, or in larger society, have resulted in health issues, some related to nutrition and health practices. The community suffers a vulnerability to, and disproportionately high rate of, alcoholism:

It has long been recognized that Native Americans are dying of diabetes, alcoholism, tuberculosis, suicide, and other health conditions at shocking rates. Beyond disturbingly high mortality rates, Native Americans also suffer a significantly lower health status and disproportionate rates of disease compared with all other Americans.

— U.S. Commission on Civil Rights (September 2004)

Studies point to rising rates of stroke, heart disease, and diabetes in the Native American population.

=== Societal discrimination and racism ===
A discriminatory sign ("no beer sold to Indians") posted above a bar. Birney, Montana, 1941

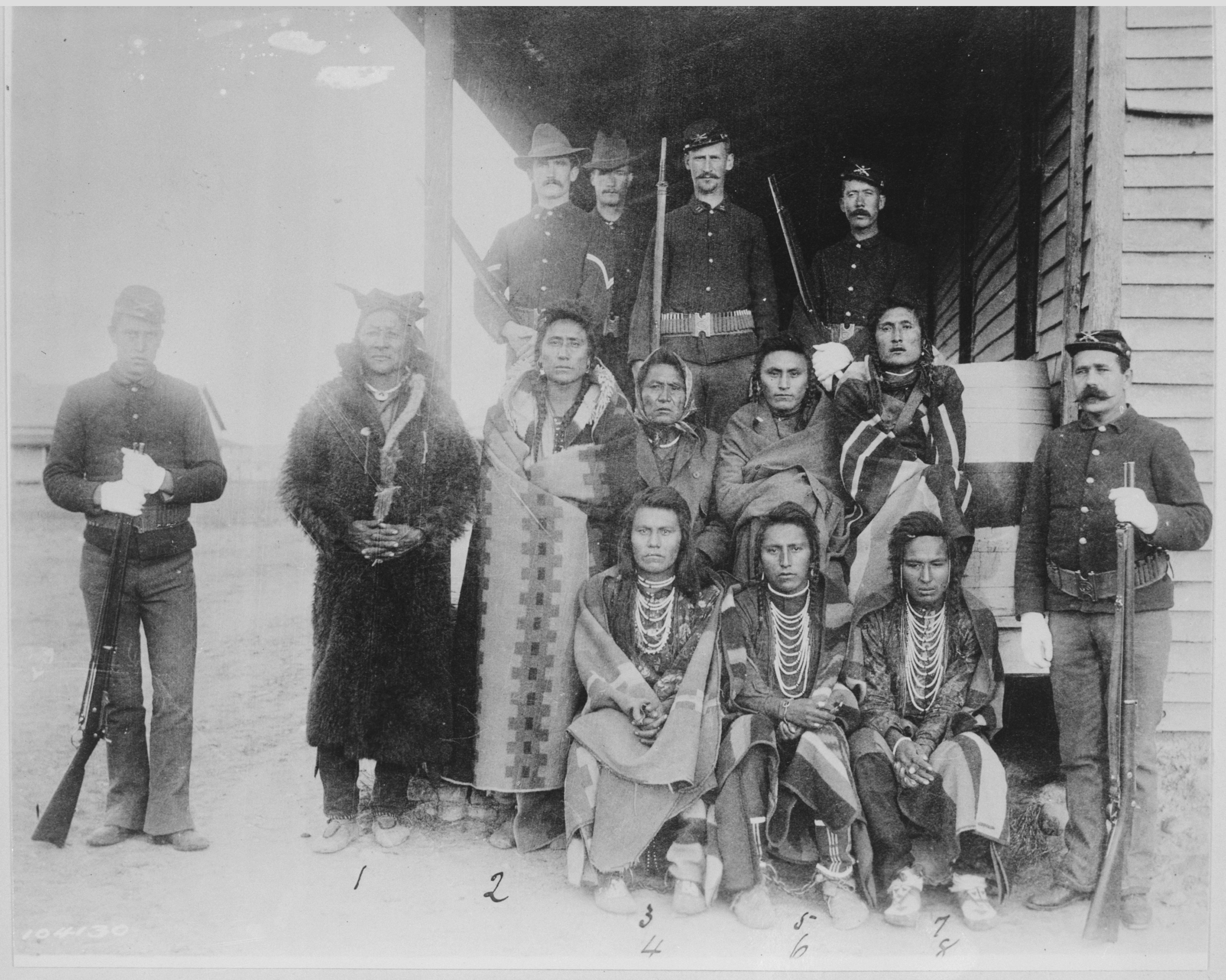
Chief Plenty Coups and eight Crow prisoners under guard at Crow agency, Montana, 1887

Native Americans have been subjected to discrimination for centuries. In response to being labeled "merciless Indian savages" in the Declaration of Independence, Simon Moya-Smith states, "Any holiday that would refer to my people in such a repugnant, racist manner is certainly not worth celebrating. [July Fourth] is a day we celebrate our resiliency, our culture, our languages, our children and we mourn the millions – literally millions – of Indigenous people who have died as a consequence of American imperialism."

In a study conducted in 2006–07, non-Native Americans stated they rarely encountered Native Americans. This is largely due to the number of Native Americans having dwindled since white settler colonialism, while those who survived were forcibly moved into reservations. Both factors were referenced by Adolf Hitler in 1928 when he admiringly stated the US had "gunned down the millions of Redskins to a few hundred thousand, and now keep the modest remnant under observation in a cage". While sympathetic toward Native Americans and expressing regret over the past, most had only a vague understanding of the problems facing Native Americans. Native Americans told researchers they believed they continued to face prejudice, mistreatment, and inequality in society.

==== Affirmative action issues ====
Federal contractors and subcontractors, such as businesses and educational institutions, are legally required to adopt equal opportunity employment and affirmative action measures intended to prevent discrimination against employees or applicants for employment on the basis of "color, religion, sex, or national origin". For this purpose, a Native American is defined as "A person having origins in any of the original peoples of North and South America (including Central America), and who maintains a tribal affiliation or community attachment". The passing of the Indian Relocation Act of 1956 saw a 56% increase in Native American city dwellers over 40 years. The Native American urban poverty rate exceeds that of reservation poverty rates due to discrimination in hiring processes. However, self-reporting is permitted: "Educational institutions and other recipients should allow students and staff to self-identify their race and ethnicity unless self-identification is not practicable or feasible." Self-reporting opened the door to "box checking" and self-identification by people who, despite not having a substantial relationship to Native American culture, innocently or fraudulently check the box for Native American.

The difficulties Native Americans face in the workforce, including lack of promotions and wrongful terminations are attributed to racial stereotypes and implicit biases. Native American business owners are seldom offered auxiliary resources crucial for entrepreneurial success.

=== Sexual violence as a tool for settler colonialism ===
Throughout history, settler colonialism has remained a violent tool to displace and exterminate Native American peoples. The use of sexual violence to perpetuate this is common. Professor Sarah Deer highlights the high number of Native women who still experience this violence: "Since 1999 a variety of reports and studies have come to the same conclusion- namely, that Native women in particular suffer the highest rate of per capita rape in the US." The continued acts of sexual violence against Native women have been perpetuated by colonization and the actions of colonizers. Native women through time have been portrayed as extremely sexual which only enforces sexual violence. Deer explains, "Dispossession and relocation of indigenous peoples on this continent both necessitated and precipitated a highly gendered and sexualized dynamic in which Native women's bodies became commodities- bought and sold for the purposes of sexual gratification (or profit), invariably transporting them far away from their homes."

=== Native American mascots ===
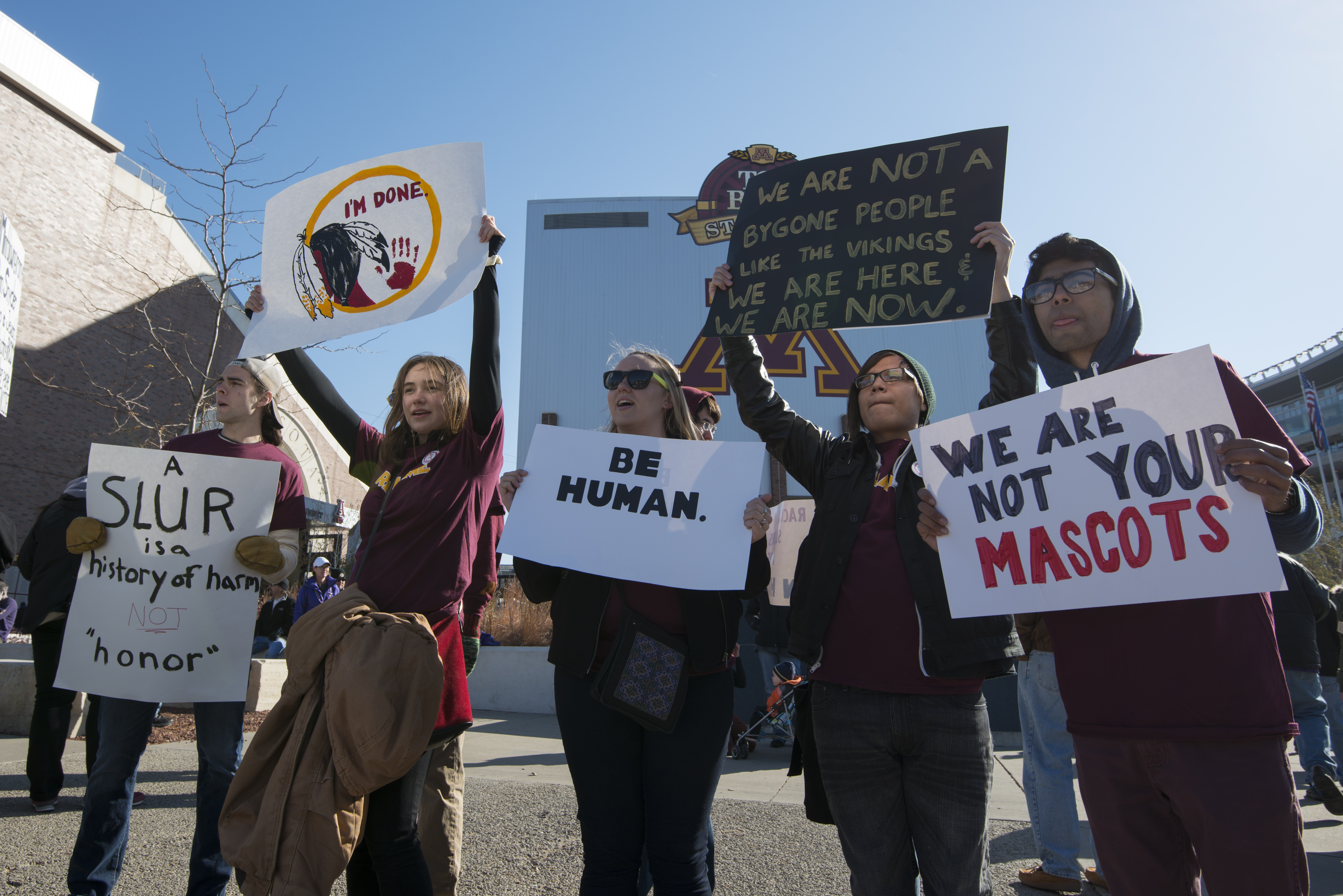
Protest against the name of the Washington Redskins in Minneapolis, November 2014

American Indian activists in the US and Canada have criticized the use of Native American mascots in sports, as perpetuating stereotypes. This is considered cultural appropriation. There has been a decline in the number of secondary school and college teams using such names, images, and mascots. Some tribal team names have been approved by the tribe in question, such as the Seminole Council of Florida approving use of their name for the teams of Florida State University. The NCAA allows the use even though the NCAA "continues to believe the stereotyping of Native Americans is wrong."

Among professional teams, the NBA's Golden State Warriors discontinued use of Native American-themed logos in 1971. The NFL's Washington Commanders, formerly the Washington Redskins, changed their name in 2020, as the term is considered a racial slur.

MLB's Cleveland Guardians were formerly known as the Cleveland Indians. Their use of a caricature called Chief Wahoo faced protest for decades. Starting in 2019, Chief Wahoo ceased to be a logo for Cleveland Indians. In December 2020, The New York Times reported that Cleveland would be officially changing their name, and in 2021, became the Cleveland Guardians.

=== Historical depictions in art ===
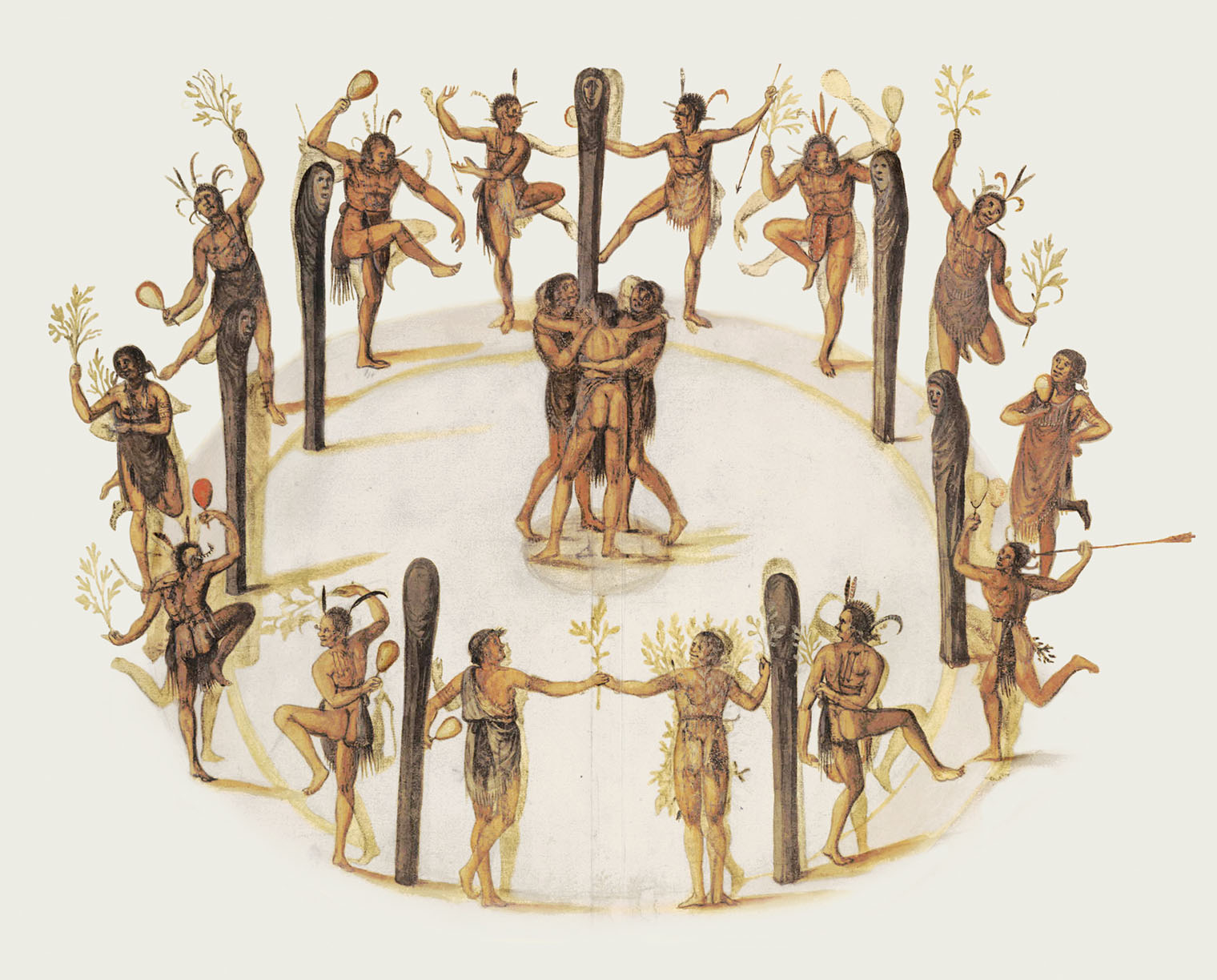
Secotan Indians' dance in North Carolina. Watercolor by John White, 1585.

Native Americans have been depicted by American artists in various ways at different periods. Several 19th- and 20th-century US and Canadian painters, often motivated by a desire to document and preserve Native culture, specialized in Native American subjects. Among the most prominent were Elbridge Ayer Burbank, George Catlin, Seth Eastman, Paul Kane, W. Langdon Kihn, Charles Bird King, Joseph Henry Sharp, and John Mix Stanley.

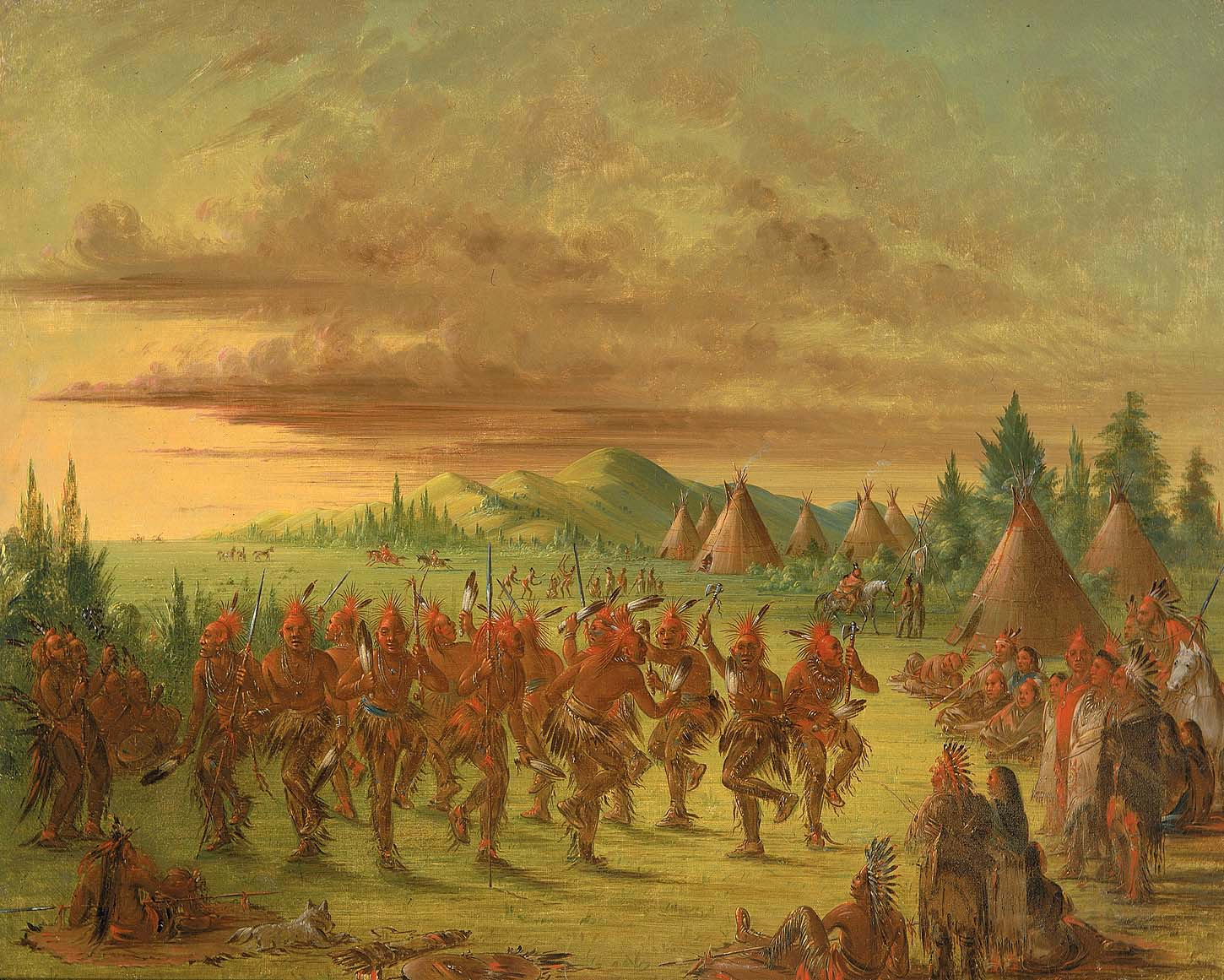
Eagle Dance of the Sac and Fox Indians, painting by George Catlin, c. 1845

In the 20th century, early portrayals of Native Americans in movies and television roles were first performed by European Americans dressed in mock traditional attire. Examples included The Last of the Mohicans (1920), Hawkeye and the Last of the Mohicans (1957), and F Troop (1965–67). In later decades, Native American actors such as Jay Silverheels in The Lone Ranger television series (1949–57) came to prominence. The roles of Native Americans were limited and not reflective of Native American culture. By the 1970s some Native American roles began to show more complexity, such as those in Little Big Man (1970), Billy Jack (1971), and The Outlaw Josey Wales (1976), which depicted Native Americans in supporting roles.

For years, Native people on American television were relegated to secondary, subordinate roles. In Bonanza (1959–73), no major or secondary Native characters appeared on a consistent basis. The series The Lone Ranger (1949–57), Cheyenne (1955–63), and Law of the Plainsman (1959–63) had Native characters who were aides to the central white characters. This continued in such series as How the West Was Won. These programs resembled the "sympathetic" yet contradictory film Dances With Wolves of 1990, in which, the narrative choice was to relate the Lakota story through a Euro-American voice, for wider impact among a general audience. Like the 1992 remake of The Last of the Mohicans and Geronimo: An American Legend (1993), Dances with Wolves employed Native American actors, and made an effort to portray Indigenous languages. In 1996, Plains Cree actor Michael Greyeyes would play renowned Native American warrior Crazy Horse in the 1996 television film Crazy Horse, and renowned Sioux chief Sitting Bull in the 2017 movie Woman Walks Ahead.

The 1998 film Smoke Signals, set on the Coeur D'Alene Reservation, discussed hardships of present-day American Indian families, featured numerous Native American actors. It was the first feature film to be produced and directed by Native Americans, and to have an exclusive Native American cast. At the Sundance Film Festival, Smoke Signals won the Audience Award and its producer Chris Eyre, an enrolled member of the Cheyenne and Arapaho Tribes of Oklahoma, won the Filmmaker's Trophy. In 2009, We Shall Remain, a documentary by Ric Burns and part of the American Experience series, presented a series "from a Native American perspective". It represented "an unprecedented collaboration between Native and non-Native filmmakers and involves Native advisors and scholars at all levels of the project". The episodes explore the impact of King Philip's War on the northeastern tribes, the "Native American confederacy" of Tecumseh's War, U.S.-forced relocation of Southeastern tribes, the pursuit and capture of Geronimo and Apache Wars, and concludes with the Wounded Knee incident, participation by the American Indian Movement, and the increasing resurgence of modern Native cultures since.

=== Differences in terminology ===
The most common of modern terms to refer to Indigenous peoples of the United States are Indians, American Indians, and Native Americans. Up to the early to mid 18th century, the term Americans was not applied to people of European heritage in North America. Instead it was equivalent to the term Indians. As people of European heritage began using the term Americans to refer instead to themselves, the word Indians became historically the most often employed term.

The term Indians, long laden with racist stereotypes, began to be replaced in the 1960s with the term Native Americans, which recognized the Indigeneity of the people who first made the Americas home. But as the term Native Americans became popular, the American Indian Movement saw pejorative connotations in the term native and reappropriated the term Indian, seeing it as witness to the history of violence against the many nations that lived in the Americas before European arrival.

The term Native American was introduced in the US in preference to the older term Indian to distinguish the Indigenous peoples of the Americas from the people of India. It may have been coined by Mohican Sachem John Wannuaucon Quinney, in an 1852 address to the US Congress where he argued against proposed resettlement.

The term Amerindian, a portmanteau of "American Indian", was coined in 1902 by the American Anthropological Association. However, it has been controversial since its creation. It was immediately rejected by some leading members of the Association, and, while adopted by many, it was never universally accepted. While never popular in Indigenous communities themselves, it remains a preferred term among some anthropologists.

During World War II, draft boards typically classified American Indians from Virginia as Negroes.

In 1995, a plurality of Indigenous Americans preferred the term American Indian and many tribes include the word Indian in their formal title.

Criticism of the neologism Native American comes from diverse sources. Russell Means, an Oglala Lakota activist, opposed the term Native American because he believed it was imposed by the government without the consent of Native people.

A 1995 U.S. Census Bureau survey found that more Native Americans in the United States preferred American Indian to Native American. Most American Indians are comfortable with Indian, American Indian, and Native American. That term is reflected in the name chosen for the National Museum of the American Indian, which opened in 2004 on the Mall in Washington, D.C..

Other commonly used terms are First Americans, First Nations, and Native Peoples.

=== Colonial ecological violence ===
Colonial ecological violence, defined by sociologist J. M. Bacon as the result of eco-social disruptions that "generate colonial ecological violence, a unique form of violence perpetrated by the settler-colonial state, private industry, and settler-colonial culture as a whole." The relocation and displacement of Native peoples is a result of the colonizer mindset that land is a commodity. By removing these communities from their land, settlers are preventing the ways of life and use of culture-affirming resources. Gilio-Whitaker highlights some of the ways in which these practices are reinforced, with the concept of environmental deprivation – "historical processes of land and resource dispossession calculated to bring about the destruction of Indigenous lives and cultures." The reason these lands are so important to Native populations is because, "Since a strong component of many Indigenous cultures is a robust relationship to place, it serves to reason that forced removals, settler resource appropriation, and the ecological damage perpetuated by US settle colonial society contribute to significant 'conflict' between 'traditional cultural values' and 'those of majority culture'."

The Karuk tribe in Klamath, California are one of many victims of colonial ecological violence. A major way of life is the use of fires to maintain and regulate their environment. These fires were used to correct travel routes and optimize hunting, a major part of Karuk life. In 1905, the Klamath National Forest was established which prevented the burning of fires on Karuk land- "Fire exclusion, then, has simultaneously produced Indigenous exclusion, erasure, and replacement." This land is one of the most economically wealthy spots due to the establishment of the forest, which further demonstrates the ways in which settler-colonialism enables and continues to negatively impact the land that Indigenous people lived on.

The Potawatomi tribe had long occupied the Great Lakes region, up until they were displaced and spread out around the US. They had previously lived on 30 million acres of land, building cultural, familial, and other-than-human relationships for generations. Kyle Powys Whyte highlights the ways in which this displacement has had violent and detrimental impacts on the tribe. "The consequences of capitalist economics, such as deforestation, water pollution, the clearing of land for large scale agriculture and urbanization, generate immediate disruptions on ecosystems "rapidly" rendering them very different from what they were like before, undermining Indigenous knowledge systems and Indigenous peoples' capacity to cultivate landscapes and adjust to environmental change."

The Miami Tribe of Oklahoma, once resided in Oxford, Ohio, where Miami University now is placed. In 1818, the tribe agreed to give up a large amount of land to U.S. officials. It was not until 1826 that Lewis Cass informed them and nearby Potawatomi, "You must remove or perish." This plan did not work, but the officials persisted and eventually the Miami tribe were forced off their land in 1846. Miami University has a land acknowledgement document and a center dedicated to working with the Miami tribe of Oklahoma, though this is the only tribe from the original Miami tribe that is accredited by the U.S. government.

=== Gambling industry ===
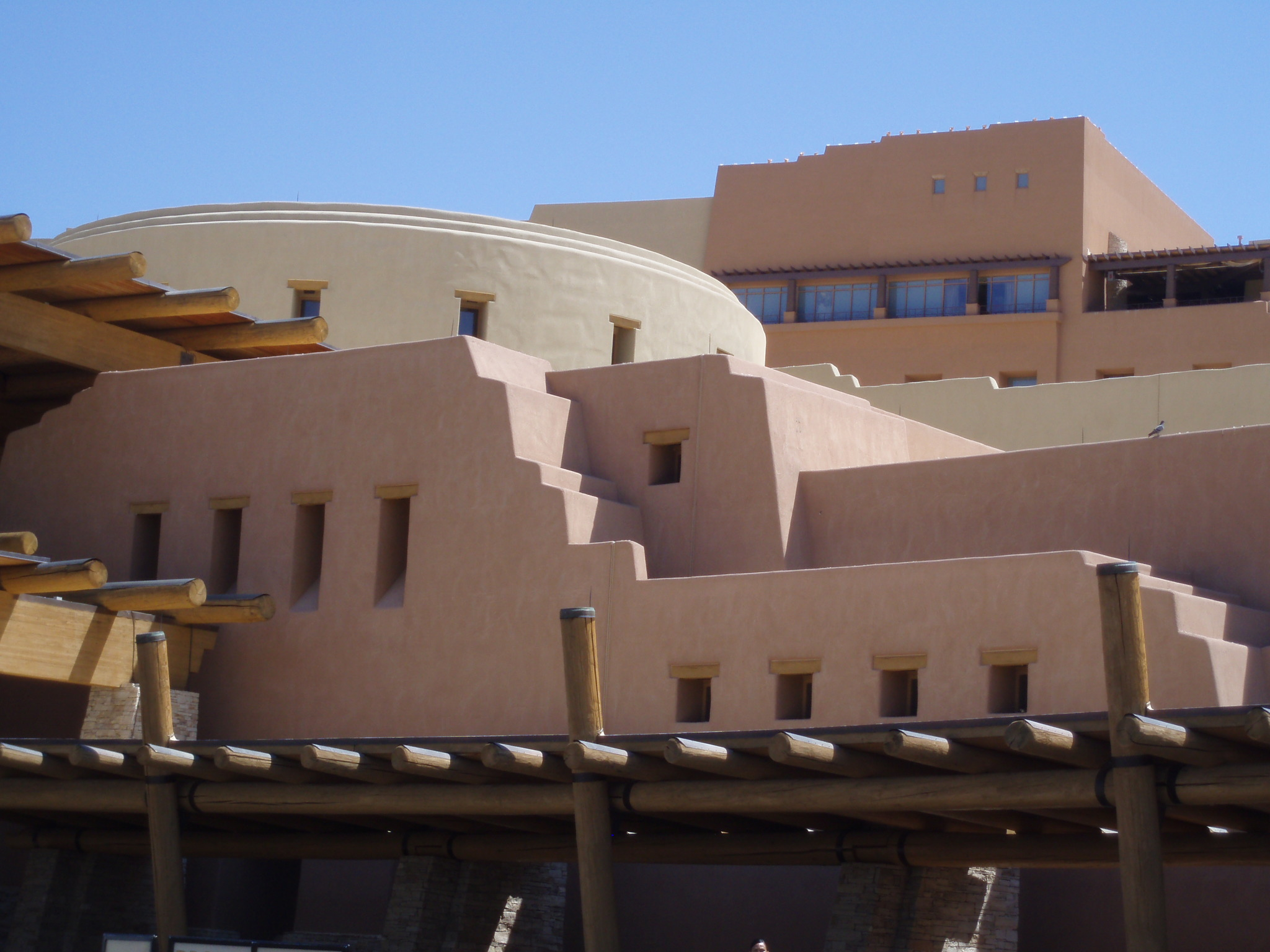
Sandia Casino, owned by the Sandia Pueblo of New Mexico

Because Indian reservations have tribal sovereignty, states have limited ability to forbid gambling there, as codified by the Indian Gaming Regulatory Act of 1988. Tribes run casinos, bingo halls, and other gambling operations, and as of 2011, there were 460 such operations run by 240 tribes, with a total annual revenue of $27 billion.

=== Financial services ===
Numerous tribes have entered financial services, including the Otoe-Missouria, Tunica-Biloxi, and the Rosebud Sioux. Because of the challenges involved in starting a financial services business, many tribes hire outside consultants and vendors to help them launch these businesses and manage the regulatory issues. Similar to the tribal sovereignty debates that occurred when tribes first entered the gaming industry, the tribes, states, and federal government are in disagreement regarding who possesses the authority to regulate these e-commerce business entities.

=== Crime on reservations ===
Prosecution of serious crime, historically endemic on reservations, was required by the 1885 Major Crimes Act, 18 U.S.C. §§1153, 3242, and court decisions to be investigated by the federal government, usually the Federal Bureau of Investigation, and prosecuted by United States Attorneys of the United States federal judicial district in which the reservation lies.

A 2009 New York Times article about growing gang violence on the Pine Ridge Indian Reservation estimated there were 39 gangs with 5,000 members on that reservation alone. Navajo country reported 225 gangs in its territory.

As of 2012, a high incidence of rape continued to impact Native American and Alaskan native women. According to the Department of Justice, 1 in 3 Native women have suffered rape or attempted rape, more than twice the national rate. About 46 percent of Native American women have been raped, beaten, or stalked by an intimate partner, according to a 2010 study by the Centers for Disease Control. "More than 80 percent of Indian victims identify their attacker as non-Indian".

=== Barriers to economic development ===
Other than tribes successfully running casinos, many tribes struggle, as they are often located on reservations isolated from economic centers. The estimated 2.1 million Native Americans are the most impoverished of all ethnic groups. According to the 2000 census, an estimated 400,000 Native Americans reside on reservation land. While some tribes have had success with gaming, only 40% of the 562 federally recognized tribes operate casinos. According to a 2007 survey, only 1% of Native Americans own and operate a business.

The barriers to economic development on Native American reservations identified by the Harvard Project on American Indian Economic Development, in What Can Tribes Do? Strategies and Institutions in American Indian Economic Development (2008), are as follows:

- Lack of access to capital
- Lack of human capital (education, skills, technical expertise) and the means to develop it
- Reservations lack effective planning
- Reservations are poor in natural resources
- Reservations have natural resources but lack sufficient control over them
- Reservations are disadvantaged by their distance from markets and the high costs of transportation
- Tribes cannot persuade investors to locate on reservations because of intense competition from non-Native American communities
- The Bureau of Indian Affairs is inept, corrupt or uninterested in reservation development
- Tribal politicians and bureaucrats are inept or corrupt
- On-reservation factionalism destroys stability in tribal decisions
- The instability of tribal government keeps outsiders from investing. The lack of international recognition Native American tribal sovereignty weakens their political-economic legitimacy.
- Entrepreneurial skills and experience are scarce

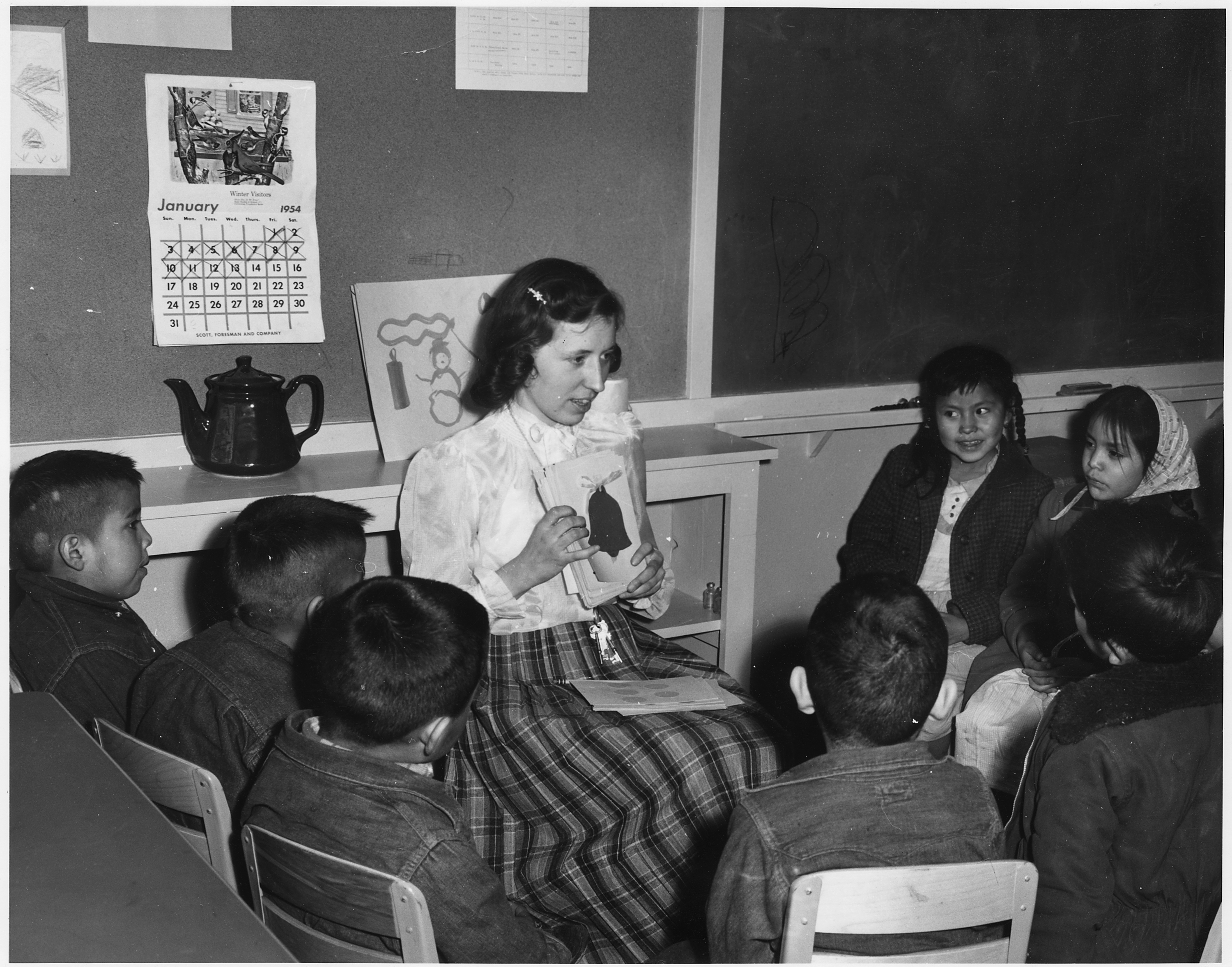
Teacher with picture cards giving English instruction to Navajo day school students

A major barrier is lack of entrepreneurial knowledge and experience within Indian reservations. "A general lack of education and experience about business is a significant challenge to prospective entrepreneurs", was the report on Native American entrepreneurship by the Northwest Area Foundation in 2004.

=== Discourse in Native American economic development ===
Some scholars argue existing theories and practices of economic development are not suitable for Native American communities—given the lifestyle, economic, and cultural differences, as well as the history of Native American-U.S. relations. Little economic development research has been conducted on Native American communities. The federal government fails to consider place-based issues of American Indian poverty by generalizing the demographic. The dominance of federal government involvement in Indigenous developmental activities perpetuates and exacerbates the salvage paradigm.

=== Land ownership challenges ===
Native land owned by individual Native Americans sometimes cannot be developed because of fractionalization. Fractionalization occurs when a landowner dies, and their land is inherited by their children, but not subdivided. This means one parcel might be owned by 50 different individuals. A majority of those holding interest must agree to any proposal to develop the land, and establishing this is time-consuming, cumbersome, and sometimes impossible.

Another issue is checkerboarding, where tribal land is interspersed with land owned by the federal government on behalf of Natives, individually-owned plots, and land owned by non-Native individuals. This prevents Tribal governments from securing plots of land large enough for economic development or agricultural uses. Because reservation land is owned "in trust" by the federal government, individuals living on reservations cannot build equity in their homes. This bars Native Americans from getting loans, as there is nothing that a bank can collect if the loan is not paid. Efforts to encourage land ownership (such as the Dawes Act) resulted in a net loss of tribal land. After they were familiarized with their smallholder status, Native American landowners were lifted of trust restrictions and their land would get transferred back to them, contingent on a transactional fee to the federal government. The transfer fee discouraged Native American land ownership, with 65% of tribal-owned land being sold to non-Native Americans by the 1920s. Activists against property rights point to historical evidence of communal ownership of land and resources by tribes. They claim that because of this history, property rights are foreign to Natives and have no place in the modern reservation system. Those in favor of property rights cite examples of tribes negotiating with colonial communities or other tribes about fishing and hunting rights. Land ownership was a challenge because of the different definitions of land that the Natives and Europeans had. Most tribes thought of property rights more as "borrowing" the land, while those from Europe thought of land as individual property.

State-level efforts such as the Oklahoma Indian Welfare Act were attempts to contain tribal land in Native American hands. The knowledge disconnect between the decision-making bureaucracy and Native American stakeholders resulted in ineffective development efforts. Traditional Native American entrepreneurship does not prioritize profit maximization; rather, business transactions must align with Native American social and cultural values. In response to Indigenous business philosophy, the federal government created policies that aimed to formalize their business practices, which undermined the Native American status quo. Legal disputes interfered with tribal land leasing, which were settled with the verdict against tribal sovereignty.

Often, bureaucratic overseers of development are removed from Native American communities and lack the knowledge and understanding to develop plans or make resource allocation decisions. The top-down heavy involvement in developmental operations, does not mitigate incentives for bureaucrats to act in their self-interest. Such instances include reports that exaggerate results.

=== Trauma ===
Historical trauma is described as collective emotional and psychological damage throughout a person's lifetime and across multiple generations. Examples can be seen through the Wounded Knee Massacre of 1890, where over 200 unarmed Lakota were killed, and the Dawes Act of 1887, when Native Americans lost four-fifths of their land.

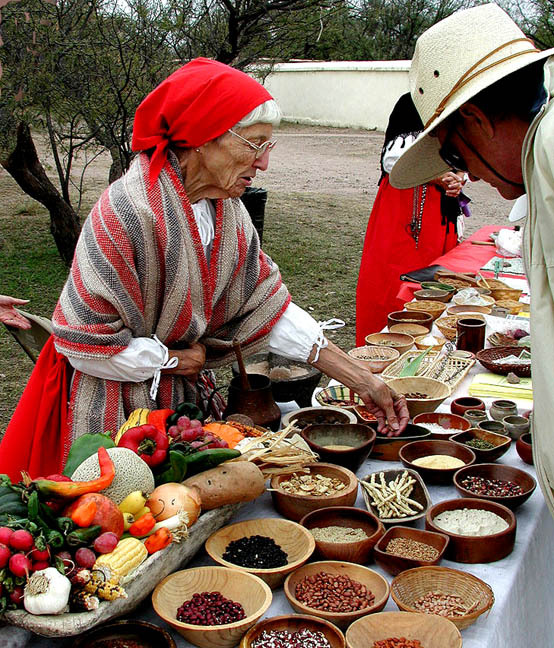
A Native American woman talks behind a table of bowls of beans, grains, and other produce at an Indigenous food demonstration.

Native American youth have higher rates of substance and alcohol use deaths than the general population. Many Native Americans can trace the beginning of their substance and alcohol use to a traumatic event related to their offender's own substance use. A person's substance use can be described as a defense mechanism against the user's emotions and trauma. For Native Americans, alcoholism is a symptom of trauma passed from generation to generation and influenced by oppressive behaviors and policies by the dominant European-American society. Boarding schools were made to "Kill the Indian, Save the man". Shame among Native Americans can be attributed to years of oppression and annihilation.

=== Food insecurity ===
Studies are being conducted which show Native Americans often experience higher rates of food insecurity than other racial groups in the US. The studies do not focus on the overall picture of Native American households, however, and tend to focus on smaller sample sizes. In a study that evaluated food insecurity among Indigenous Americans, White, Black, Hispanic, and Asian: it was reported that over the 10-year span of 2000–10, Indigenous people were reported to be one of the highest at-risk groups from a lack of access to adequate food, reporting about 25% of households suffering from this type of insecurity. There are many reasons, the biggest is high food costs on or near reservations, lack of access to well-paying jobs, and predisposition to health issues relating to obesity and mental health.

== Society, language, and culture ==
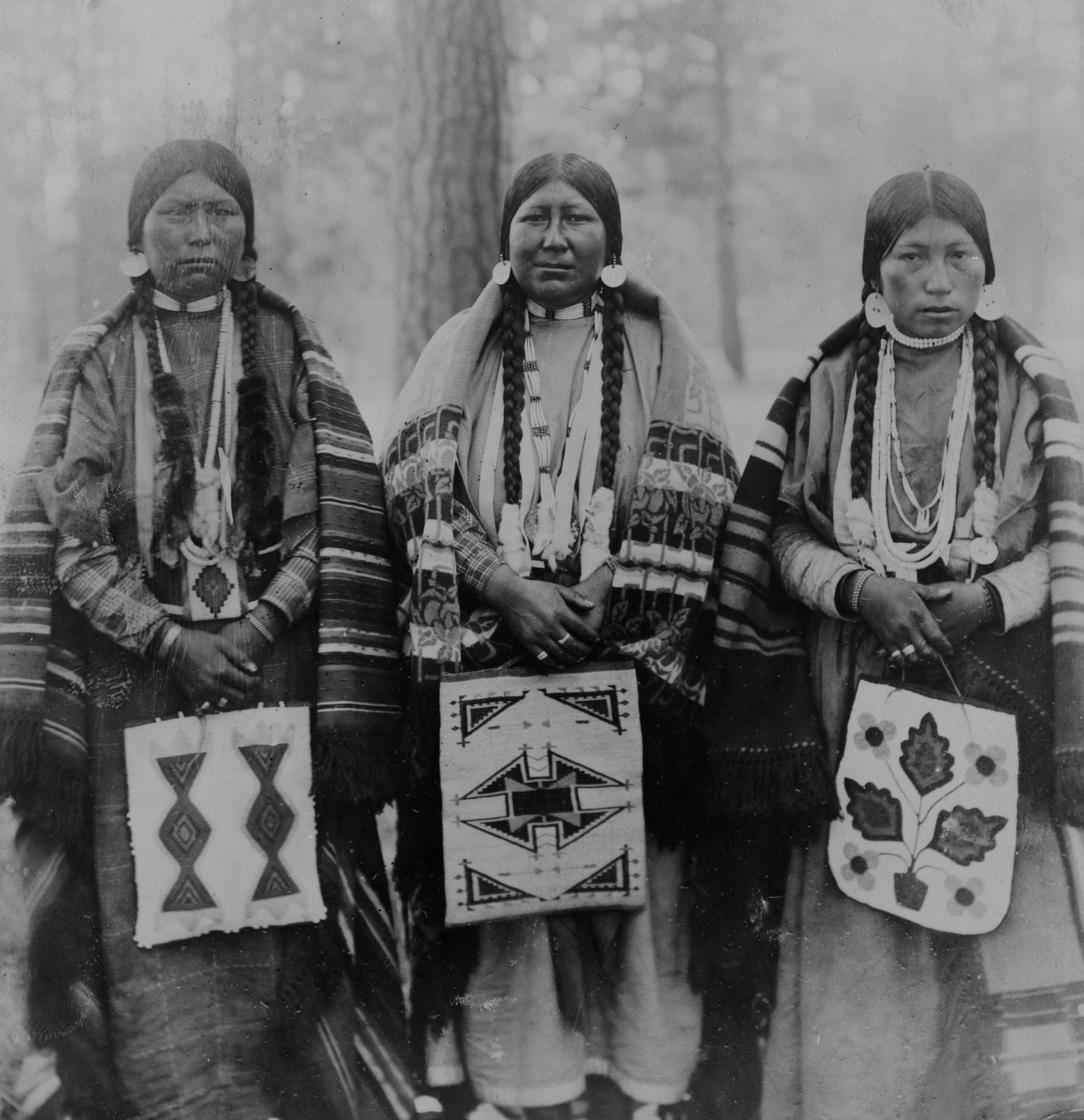
Native American women in Warm Springs Indian Reservation, Wasco County, Oregon (1902)

The culture of Pre-Columbian America is usually defined by the concept of the culture area, namely a region where shared cultural traits occur. The northwest culture area, for example, shared common traits such as salmon fishing, woodworking, and large villages or towns, and a hierarchical social structure. Ethnographers generally classify the Indigenous peoples of North America into ten cultural areas based on region.

Though cultural features, language, clothing, and customs vary from one tribe to another, there are certain elements which are encountered frequently and shared by many tribes. Early scholars described the Native Americans as having a society dominated by clans.

European colonization had a major impact on Native American cultures through what is known as the Columbian exchange, which was the widespread transfer of plants, animals, culture, human populations, technology, and ideas between the Americas and Eurasia (the Old World) in the 15th and 16th centuries, following Christopher Columbus's 1492 voyage. They exchanged food, crafts, and furs for blankets, iron and steel implements, horses, trinkets, firearms, and alcoholic beverages. The Columbian exchange generally had a destructive impact on Native American cultures through disease, and a 'clash of cultures', whereby European values of private land ownership, the family, and division of labor, led to conflict, appropriation of traditional communal lands and changed how Indigenous tribes practiced slavery.

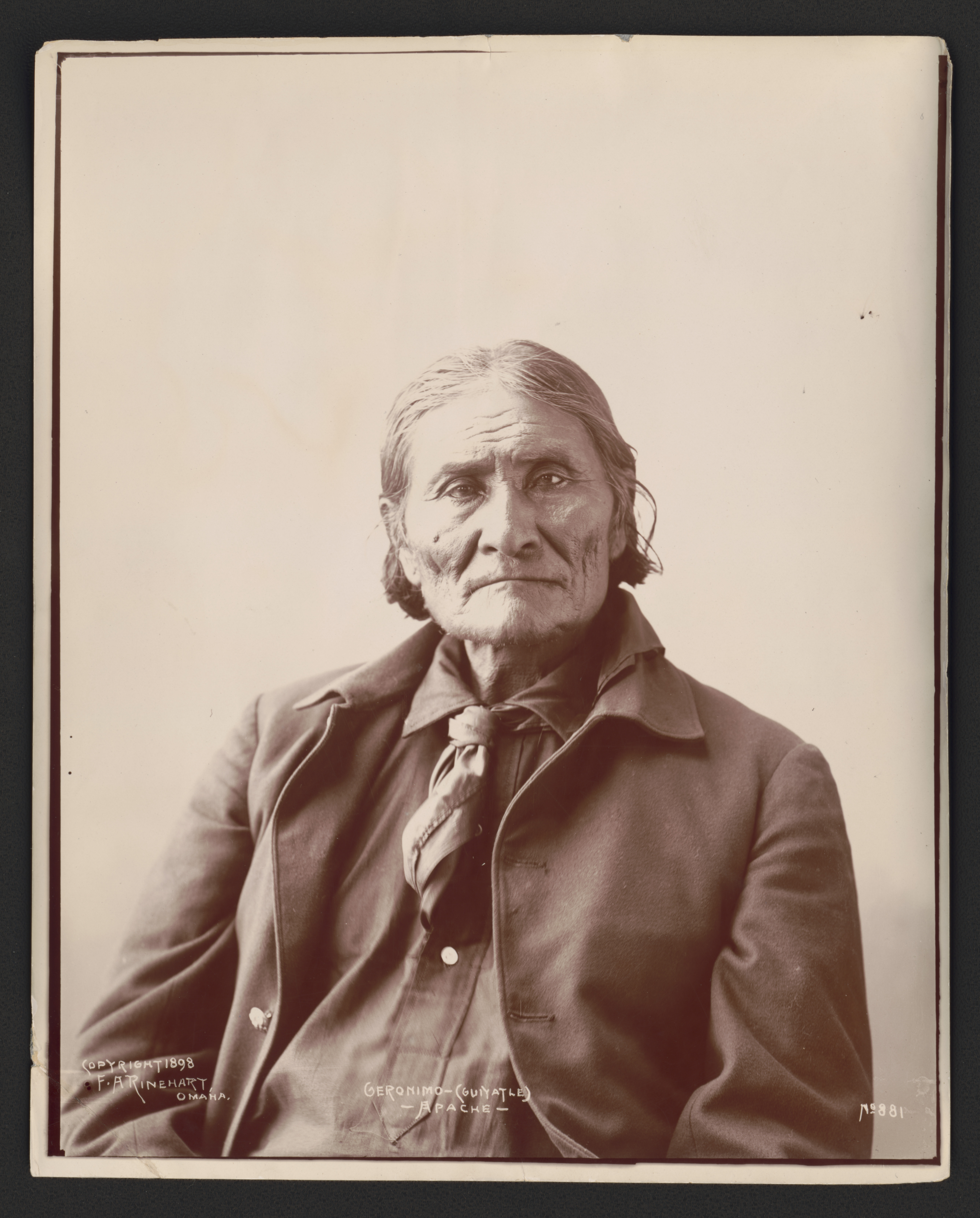
Geronimo, Chiricahua Apache leader, 1898, by Frank Rinehart

The impact of the Columbian exchange was not entirely negative. For example, the re-introduction of the horse to North America allowed the Plains Indians to revolutionize their ways of life by making hunting, trading, and warfare more effective, and to improve their ability to transport possessions and move settlements. The Great Plains tribes were still hunting bison when they first encountered Europeans. Reintroduction of the horse changed the way in which they hunted large game. Horses became such a valuable, central element of Native lives that they were counted as a measure of wealth by many tribes.

=== Ethno-linguistic classification ===
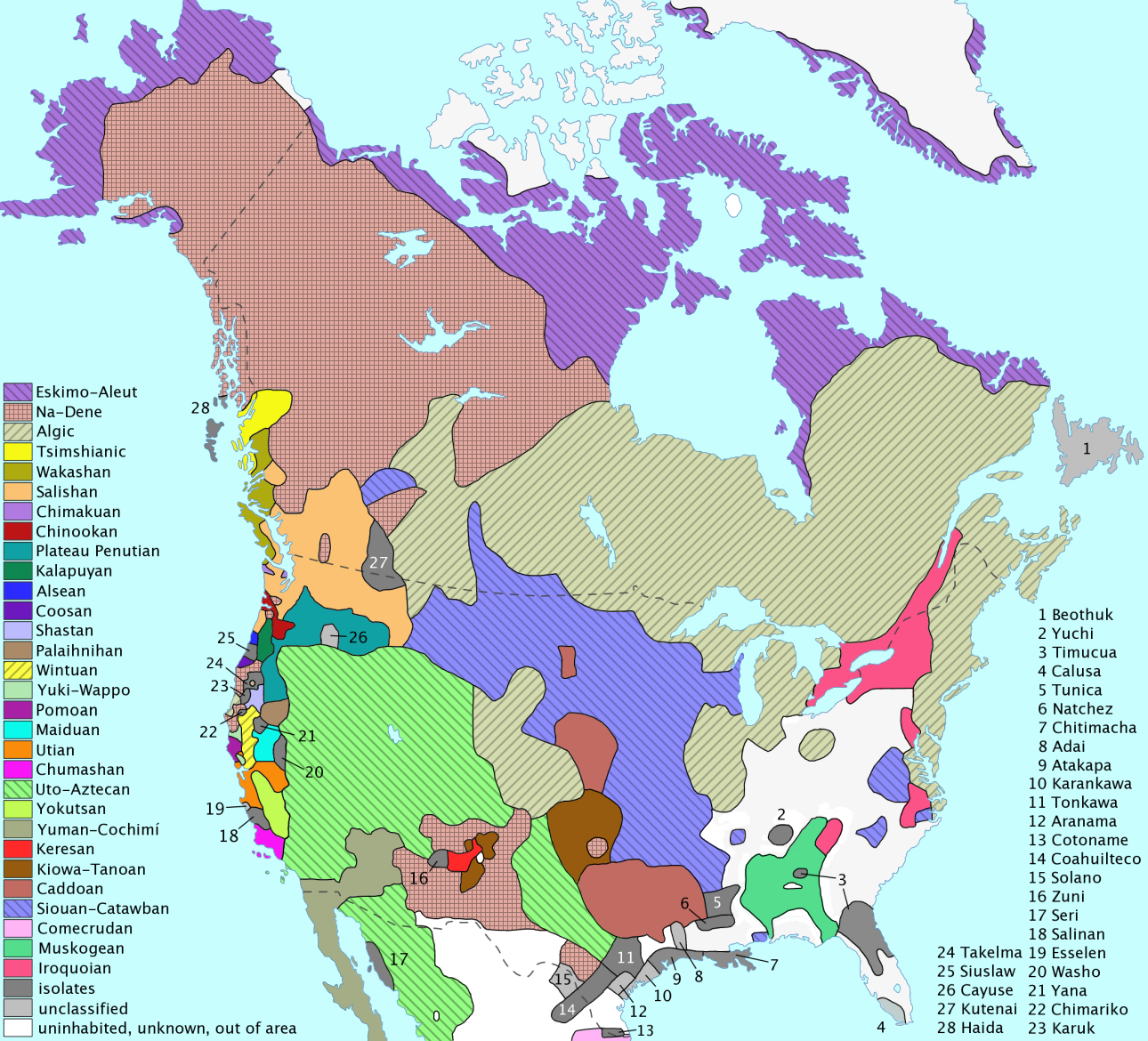
Pre-contact: distribution of North American language families, including northern Mexico

The Na-Dené, Algic, and Uto-Aztecan language families are the largest by number of languages. Uto-Aztecan has the most speakers (2 million) if the languages in Mexico are considered; Na-Dené comes second with approximately 200,000 speakers, and Algic third with about 180,000 speakers. Na-Dené and Algic have the widest geographic distributions: Algic spans from northeast Canada across much of the continent down to northeast Mexico with two outliers in California (Yurok and Wiyot); Na-Dené spans from Alaska and west Canada through Washington, Oregon, and California to the U.S. Southwest and northern Mexico. Several families consist of only 2 languages. Demonstrating genetic relationships has proved difficult due to the linguistic diversity present in North America. Two large (super-) family proposals, Penutian and Hokan have potential.

Words used in English have been derived from Native American languages.

==== Language education ====
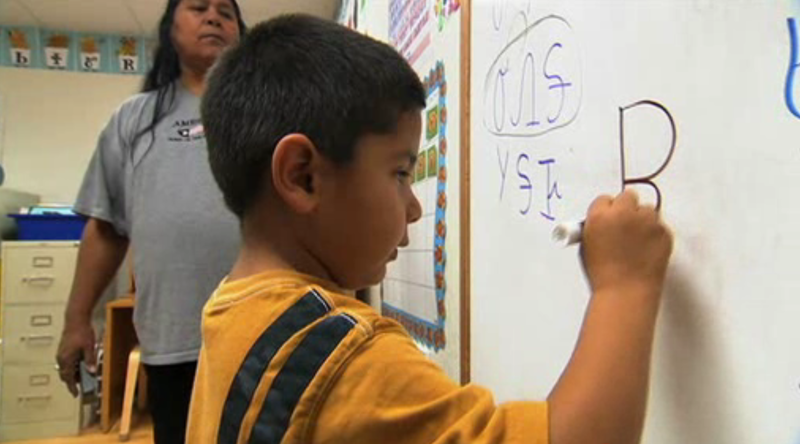
Oklahoma Cherokee language immersion school student writing in the Cherokee syllabary

To counteract a shift to English, some Native American tribes have initiated language immersion schools for children, where an Indigenous American language is the medium of instruction. The Cherokee Nation initiated a 10-year language preservation plan that involved raising new fluent speakers of the Cherokee language from childhood up through school immersion programs, as well as community effort to continue to use the language at home. This plan was part of a goal that, in 50 years, will result in 80% or more of the Cherokee being fluent. The Cherokee Preservation Foundation has invested $3 million in opening schools, training teachers, and developing curricula for language education, as well as initiating community gatherings where the language can be actively used. Formed in 2006, the Kituwah Preservation & Education Program (KPEP) on the Qualla Boundary focuses on language immersion programs for children from birth to fifth grade, developing cultural resources for the public and community language programs to foster the Cherokee language among adults.

There is a Cherokee language immersion school in Tahlequah, Oklahoma, that educates students from pre-school through eighth grade. Because Oklahoma's official language is English, Cherokee immersion students are hindered when taking state-mandated tests because they can have little competence in English. The Department of Education of Oklahoma said that in 2012 state tests: 11% of the school's sixth-graders showed proficiency in math, and 25% in reading; 31% of the seventh-graders showed proficiency in math, and 87% in reading; 50% of eighth-graders showed proficiency in math, and 78% in reading. The Department of Education listed the charter school as a Targeted Intervention school, meaning it was identified as a low-performing school. Ultimately, the school made a C, or a 2.33 grade point average on the state's A-F report card system. The report card shows the school getting an F in mathematics achievement and mathematics growth, a C in social studies achievement, a D in reading achievement, and an A in reading growth and student attendance. "The C we made is tremendous", said school principal Holly Davis, "[t]here is no English instruction in our school's younger grades, and we gave them this test in English." She had anticipated the low grade because it was the school's first year as a state-funded charter school, and many had difficulty with English. Eighth graders who graduate from the Tahlequah immersion school are fluent speakers of the language, and they usually go on to attend Sequoyah High School where classes are taught in English and Cherokee.

=== Indigenous foodways ===
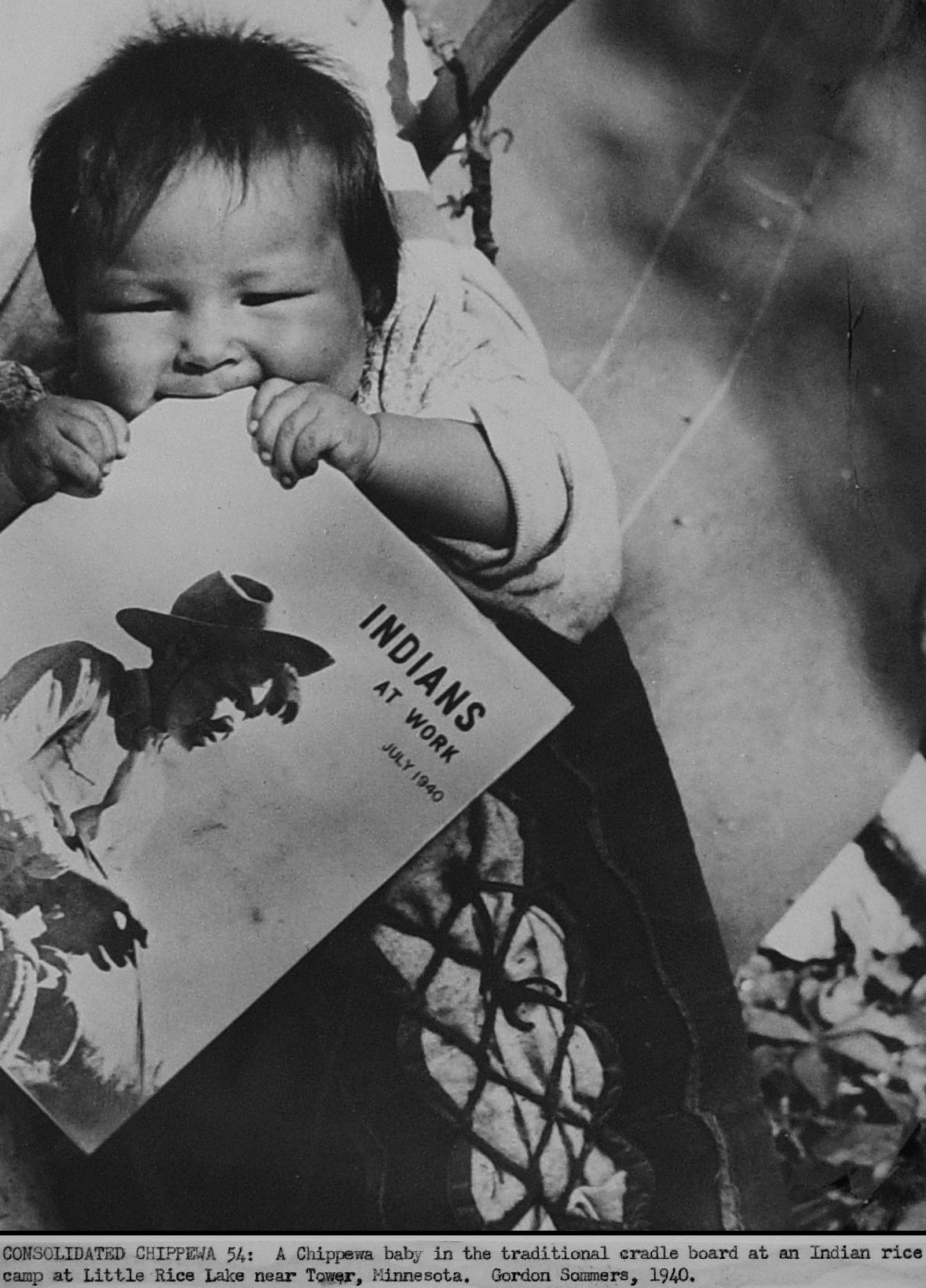
Ojibwe baby waits on a cradleboard while parents tend wild rice crops (Minnesota, 1940).

Historical diets of Native Americans differed dramatically from region to region. Different peoples might have relied more heavily on agriculture, horticulture, hunting, fishing, or gathering wild plants and fungi. Tribes developed diets best suited to their environments.

Iñupiat, Yupiit, Unangan, and fellow Alaska Natives fished, hunted, and harvested wild plants, but did not rely on agriculture. Coastal peoples relied more heavily on sea mammals, fish, and fish eggs, while inland peoples hunted caribou and moose. Alaskan Natives prepared and preserved dried and smoked meat and fish.

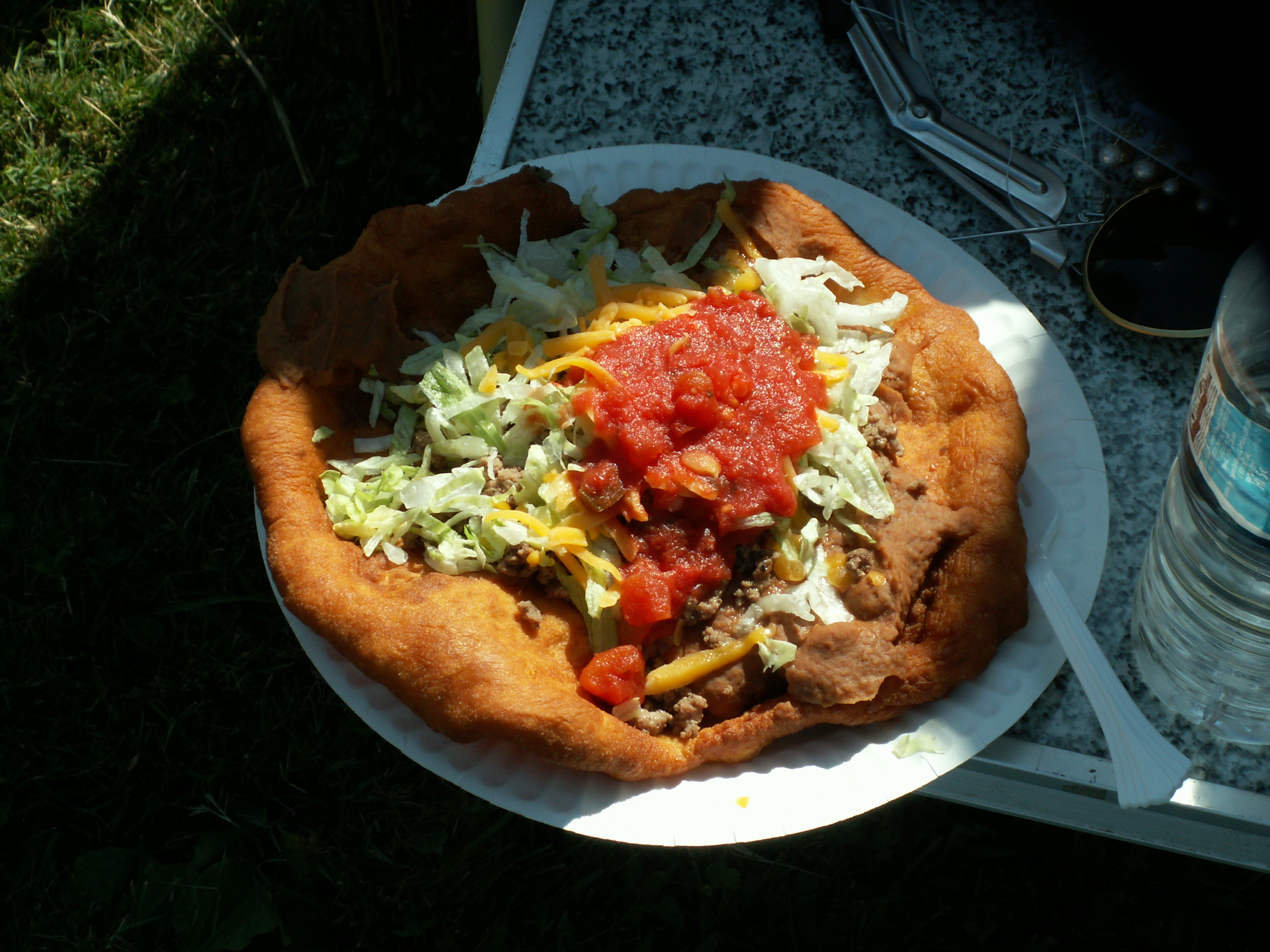
Frybread, made into an Indian taco

Pacific Northwest tribes crafted seafaring dugout canoes 40–50 feet (12–15 m) long for fishing. In the Eastern Woodlands, early peoples independently invented agricultural and by 1800 BCE developed the crops of the Eastern Agricultural Complex, which include squash (Cucurbita pepo ssp. ovifera), sunflower (Helianthus annuus var. macrocarpus), goosefoot (Chenopodium berlandieri), and marsh elder (Iva annua var. macrocarpa).

The Sonoran Desert region including parts of Arizona and California, part of a region known as Aridoamerica, relied on the tepary bean as a staple crop. This and other desert crops, mesquite bead pods, tunas (prickly pear fruit), cholla buds, saguaro cactus fruit, and acorns are actively promoted by Tohono O'odham Community Action. In the Southwest, some communities developed irrigation techniques while others, such as the Hopi dry-farmed. They filled storehouses with grain as protection against the area's frequent droughts.

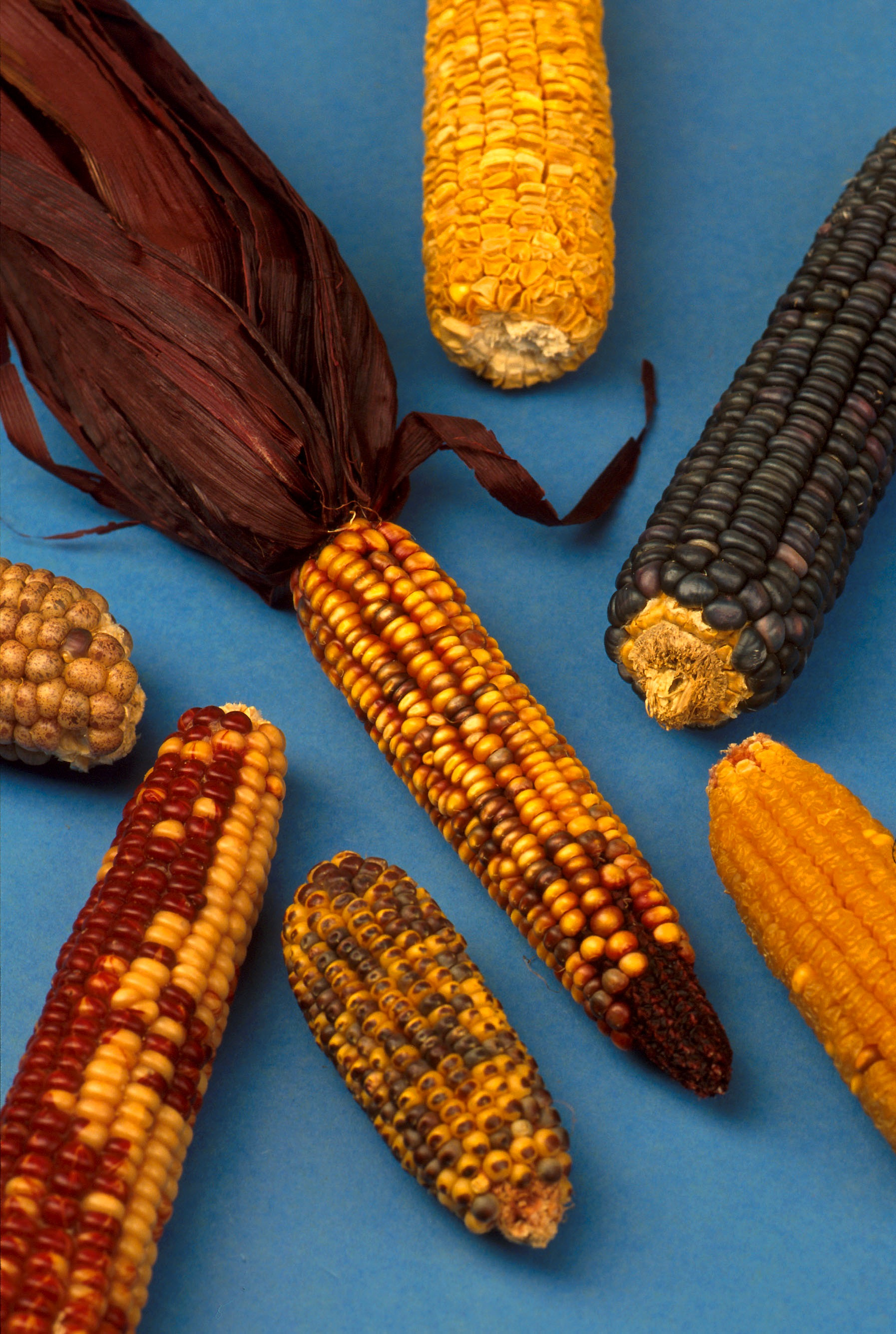
Maize grown by Native Americans

Maize or corn, first cultivated in what is now Mexico, was traded north into Aridoamerica and Oasisamerica, southwest. Maize cultivation spread throughout the Great Plains and Eastern Woodlands by 200 CE. Native farmers practiced polycropping maize, beans, and squash; these crops are known as the Three Sisters. The beans would replace the nitrogen, which the maize leached from the ground, as well as using corn stalks for support for climbing. The deficiencies of a diet dependent on maize were mitigated by the practice of converting maize kernels into hominy in a process called Nixtamalization.

The agriculture gender roles of the Native Americans varied from region to region. In the Southwest area, men prepared the soil with hoes. The women were in charge of planting, weeding, and harvesting. In most other regions, the women were in charge of most agriculture, including clearing the land, which was an immense chore, as they rotated fields. Europeans in the eastern part of the continent observed that Native Americans cleared large areas for cropland. Their fields in New England sometimes covered hundreds of acres. Colonists in Virginia noted thousands of acres under cultivation by Native Americans.

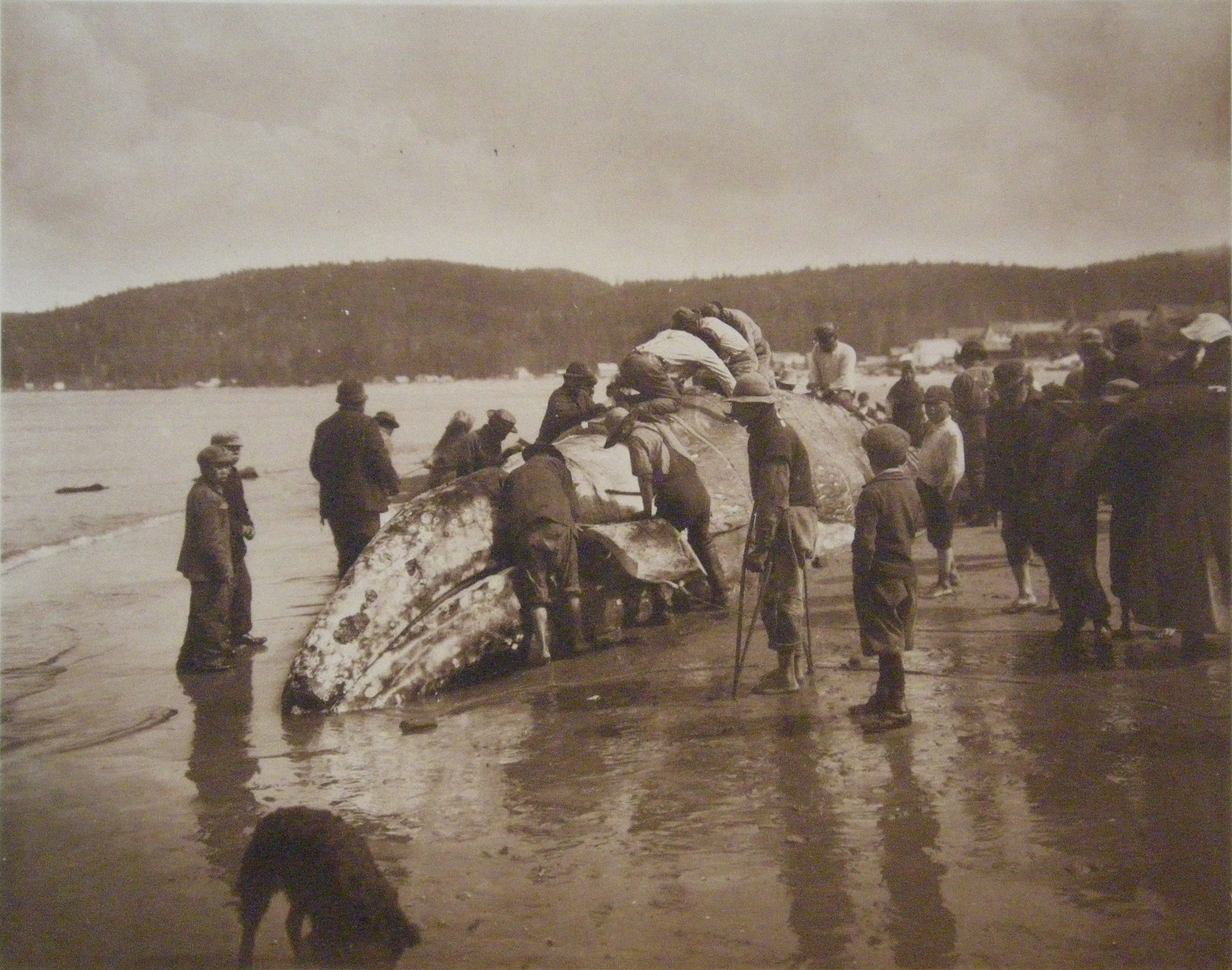
Makah Native Americans and a whale, The King of the Seas in the Hands of the Makahs, 1910 photograph by Asahel Curtis

Early farmers commonly used tools such as the hoe, maul, and dibber. The hoe was the main tool used to till the land and prepare it for planting; then it was used for weeding. The first versions were made out of wood and stone. When the settlers brought iron, Native Americans switched to iron hoes and hatchets. The dibber was a digging stick, used to plant the seed. Once the plants were harvested, women prepared the produce for eating. They used the maul to grind the corn into a mash. It was cooked and eaten that way or baked as cornbread.

=== Religion ===
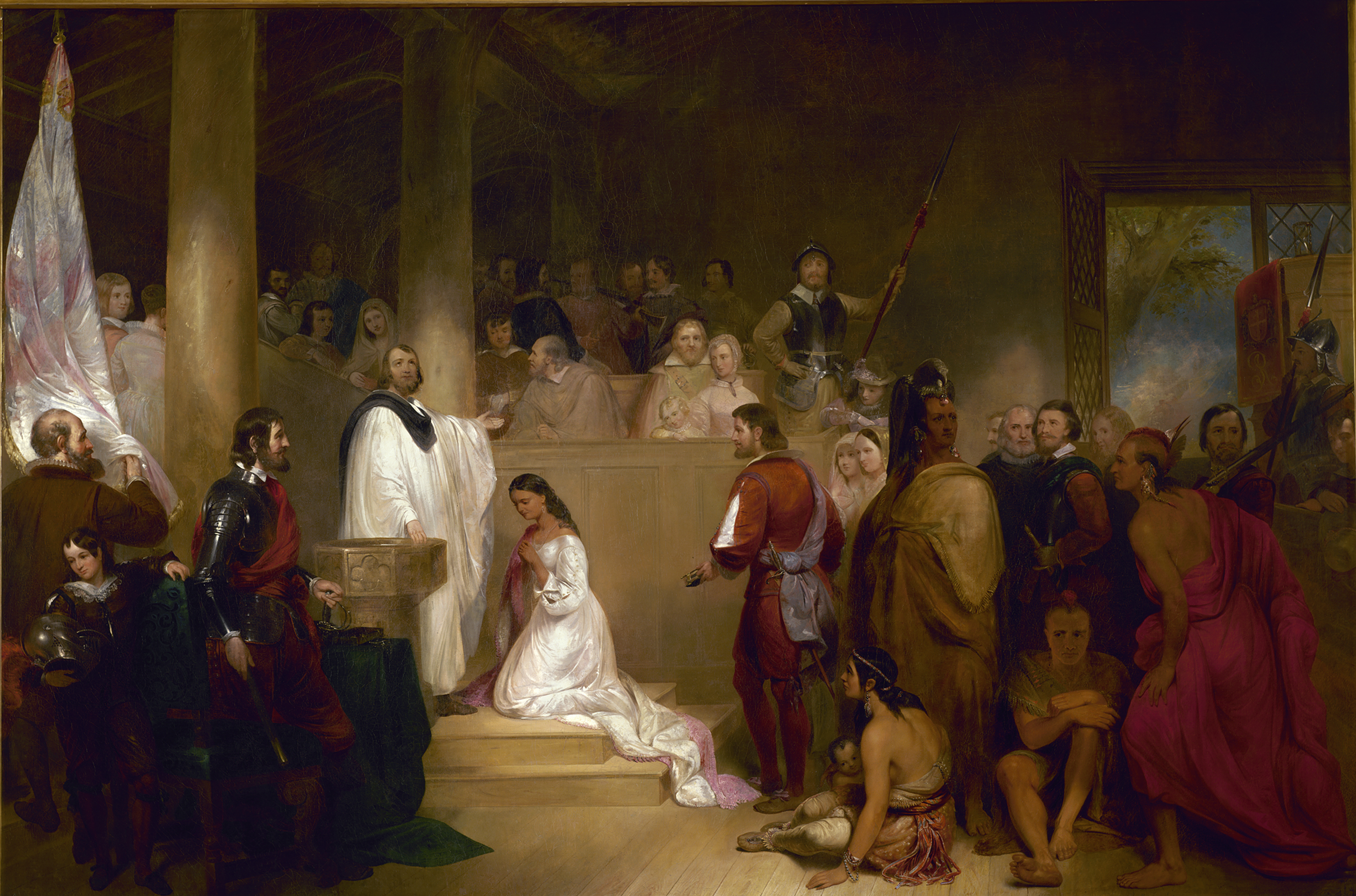
Baptism of Pocahontas, painted in 1840 by John Gadsby Chapman

Native American religious practices and beliefs, differ widely across tribes. These spiritualities, practices, beliefs, may accompany adherence to another faith or can represent a person's primary religious, faith, spiritual or philosophical identity. Much Native American spirituality exists in a tribal-cultural continuum, so cannot be easily separated from tribal identity itself.

Some tribes include the use of sacred leaves and herbs such as tobacco, sweetgrass or sage. Many Plains tribes have sweatlodge ceremonies, though the specifics vary among tribes. Fasting, singing, prayer, and drumming are common.

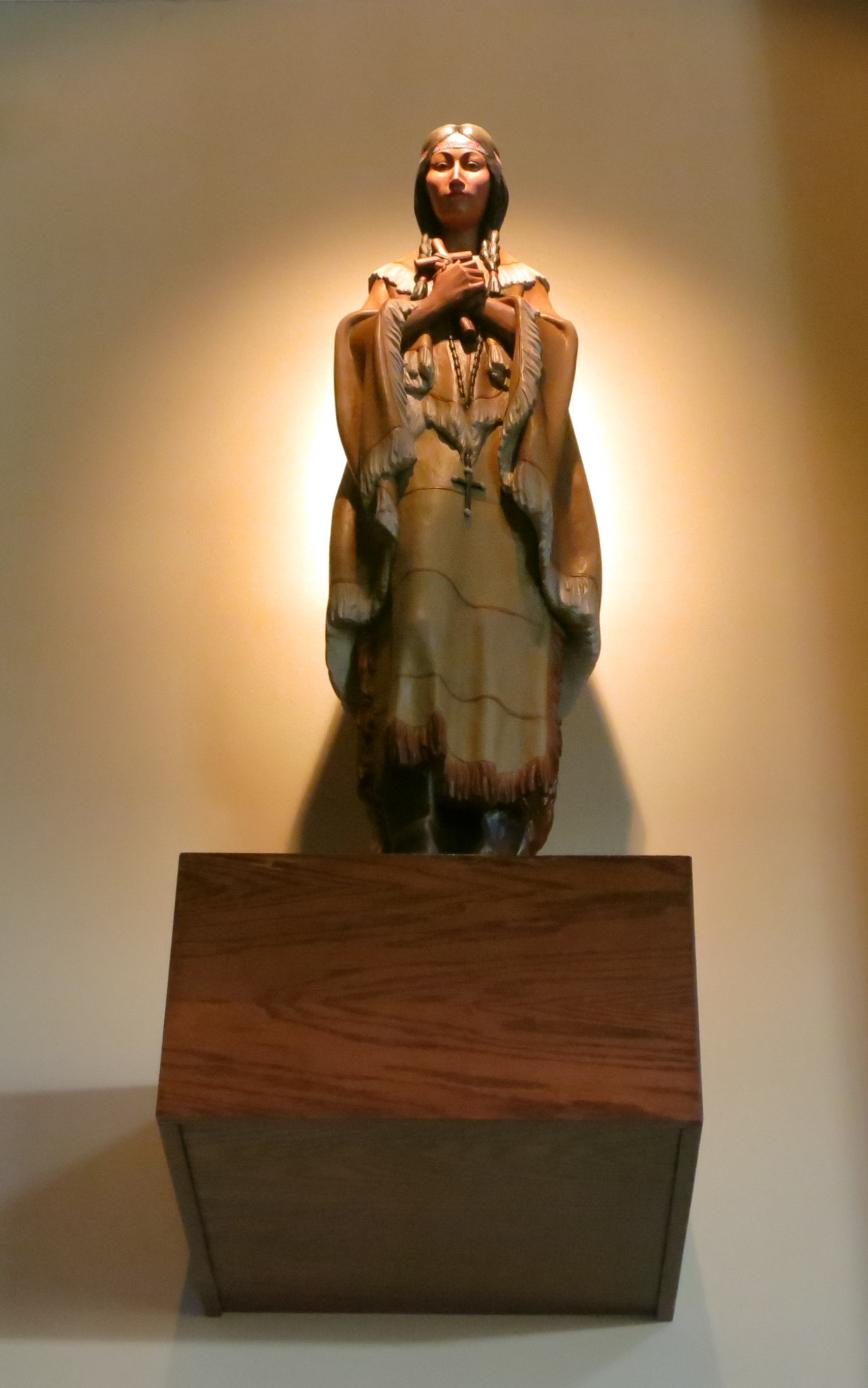
Saint Kateri Tekakwitha, the patron of ecologists, exiles, and orphans, was canonized by the Catholic Church

The Midewiwin Lodge is a medicine society inspired by the oral history and prophesies of the Ojibwa (Chippewa) and related tribes.

Another significant religious body among Native peoples is known as the Native American Church. It is a syncretistic church incorporating elements of Native spiritual practice from different tribes as well as symbolic elements from Christianity. Its main rite is the peyote ceremony. Prior to 1890, traditional religious beliefs included Wakan Tanka. In the American Southwest, especially New Mexico, a syncretism between the Catholicism brought by Spanish missionaries and the native religion is common; the religious drums, chants, and dances of the Pueblo people are regularly part of Masses at Santa Fe's Saint Francis Cathedral. Native American-Catholic syncretism is also found elsewhere in the US. Some Native American tribes who practice Christianity, including the Lumbee, organized denominations, such as the Lumber River Conference of the Holiness Methodist Church.

The eagle feather law stipulates that only individuals of certifiable Native American ancestry, enrolled in a federally recognized tribe, are legally authorized to obtain eagle feathers for religious or spiritual use. The law does not allow Native Americans to give eagle feathers to non-Native Americans.

=== Gender roles ===
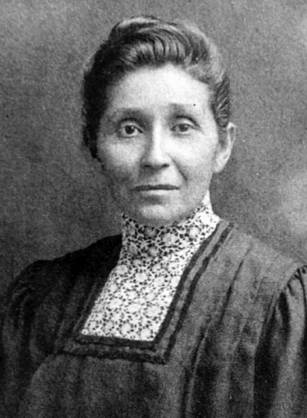
Susan La Flesche Picotte was the first Native American woman to become a physician in the United States.

Gender roles are differentiated in many Native American tribes. Many Natives have retained traditional expectations of sexuality and gender and continue to do so in contemporary life despite ongoing colonial pressures.

Whether a particular tribe is predominantly matrilineal or patrilineal, often both sexes have some degree of decision-making power within the tribe. Many Nations, such as the Haudenosaunee Five Nations and the Southeast Muskogean tribes, have matrilineal or Clan Mother systems, in which property and hereditary leadership are controlled by and passed through the maternal lines. In these Nations, the children are considered to belong to the mother's clan. In Cherokee culture, women own the family property. When traditional young women marry, their husbands may join them in their mother's household.

Matrilineal structures enable young women to have assistance in childbirth and rearing and protect them in case of conflicts between the couple. If a couple separates or the man dies, the woman has her family to assist her. In matrilineal cultures the mother's brothers are usually the leading male figures in her children's lives; fathers have no standing in their wife and children's clan, as they still belong to their mother's clan. Hereditary clan chief positions pass through the mother's line and chiefs have historically been selected on the recommendations of women elders, who could also disapprove of a chief.

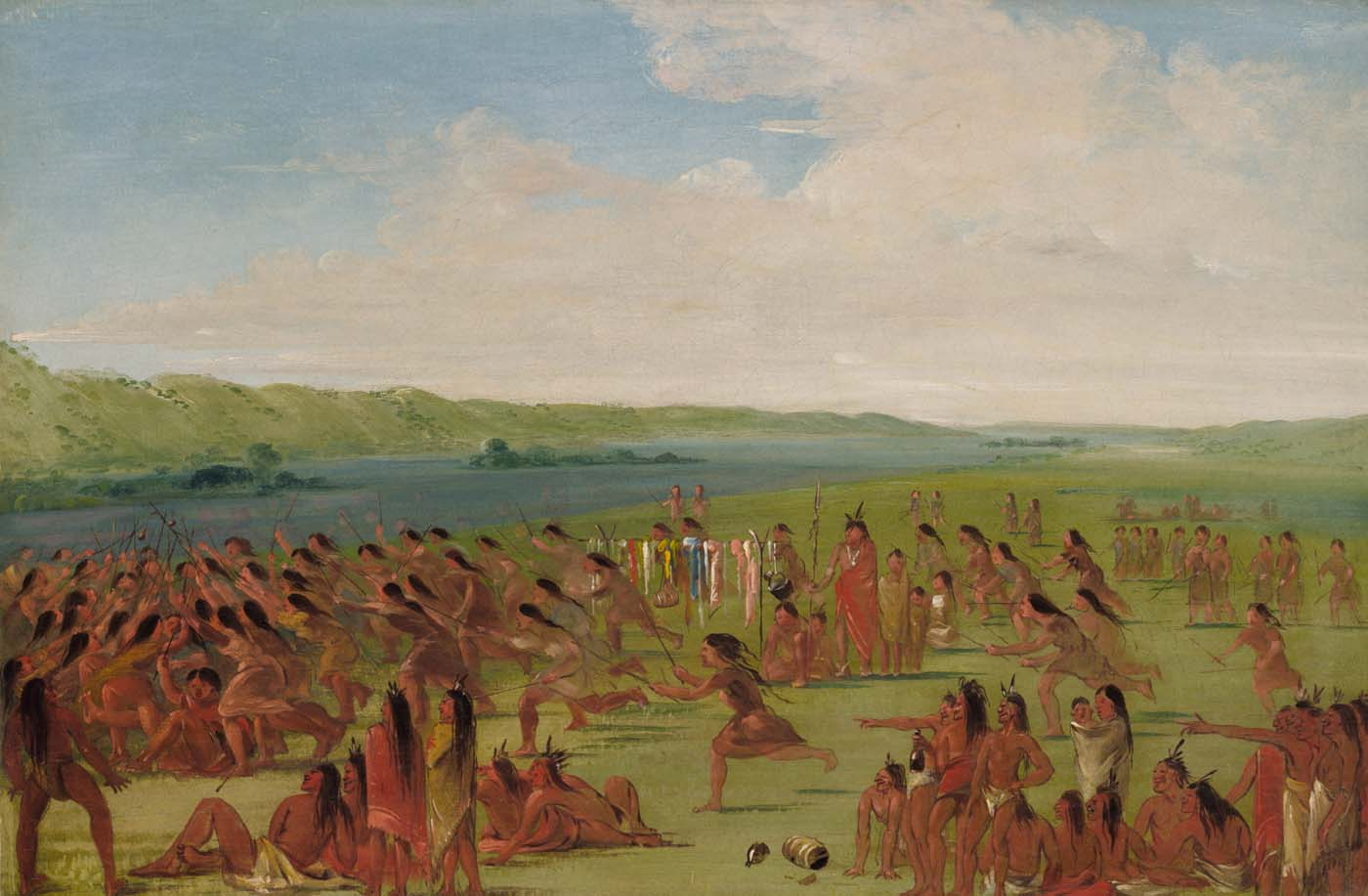
Ball-play of the women, painting by George Catlin, c. 1835

In the patrilineal tribes, such as the Omaha, Osage, Ponca, and Lakota, hereditary leadership passes through the male line, and children are considered to belong to the father and his clan. In patrilineal tribes, if a woman marries a non-Native, she is no longer considered part of the tribe, and her children are considered to share the ethnicity and culture of their father.

In patriarchal tribes, gender roles tend to be rigid. Men have historically hunted, traded and made war while women have primary responsibility for the survival and welfare of the families (and future of the tribe). Women usually gather and cultivate plants, use plants and herbs to treat illnesses, care for the young and the elderly, make clothing and instruments, and process and cure meat and skins from the game. Some mothers use cradleboards to carry an infant while working or traveling. In matriarchal and egalitarian nations, the gender roles are usually not so clear-cut and even less so in the modern era. Several dozen tribes allowed polygyny to sisters, with procedural and economic limits.

Lakota, Dakota, and Nakota girls are encouraged to learn to ride, hunt and fight. Though fighting in war has mostly been left to the boys and men, occasionally women have fought, in battles and defense of the home, especially if the tribe was severely threatened.

=== Modern education ===
As of 2020 90% of Native American school-aged children attend public schools operated by school districts. Tribally-operated schools under contracts/grants with the Bureau of Indian Education (BIE) and direct BIE-operated schools took about 8% of Native American students, including students who live in very rural remote areas.

In 1978, 215,000 (78%) of Native Americans attended school district-operated public schools, 47,000 (17%) attended schools directly operated by the BIA, 2,500 (1%) attended tribal or other schools that contracted with the BIA, and the remaining 9,000 (3%) attended missionary schools for Native American children or other private schools.

=== Sports ===
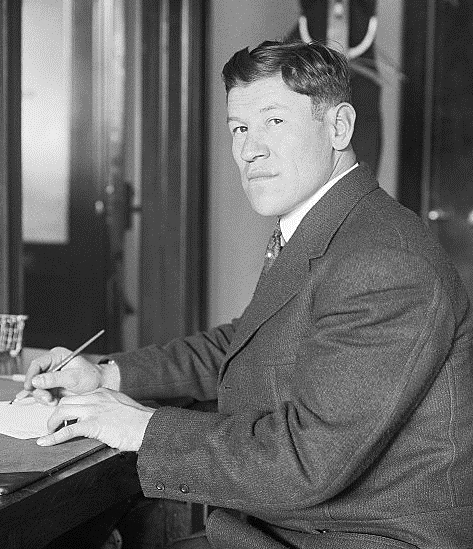
Jim Thorpe, gold medalist at the 1912 Olympics, in the pentathlon and decathlon events

Native American leisure time led to competitive individual and team sports. Jim Thorpe, Lewis Tewanima, Joe Hipp, Notah Begay III, Chris Wondolowski, Jacoby Ellsbury, Joba Chamberlain, Kyle Lohse, Sam Bradford, Jack Brisco, Tommy Morrison, Billy Mills, Angel Goodrich, Shoni Schimmel, and Kyrie Irving are well known professional athletes.

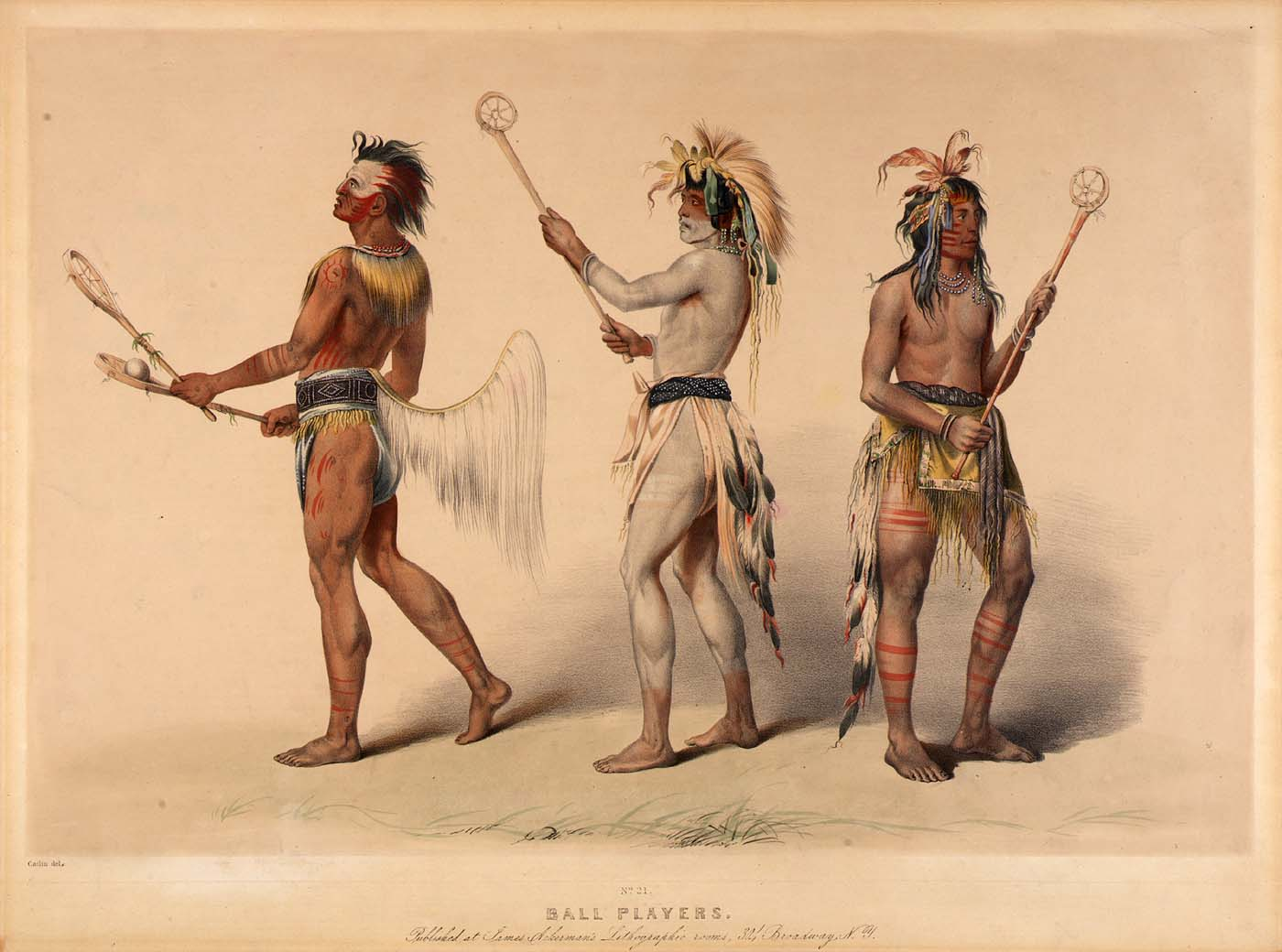
Ball players from the Choctaw and Lakota tribe in a 19th-century lithograph by George Catlin

==== Team sports ====
Native American ball sports, sometimes referred to as lacrosse, stickball, or baggataway, were often used to settle disputes, rather than war, as a civil way to settle conflict. The Choctaw called it isitoboli ("Little Brother of War"); the Onondaga name was dehuntshigwa'es ("men hit a rounded object"). There are three basic versions, classified as Great Lakes, Iroquoian, and Southern.

The game is played with one or two rackets or sticks and one ball. The object is to land the ball in the opposing team's goal (either a single post or net) and prevent the opposing team from scoring. The game involves 20 or as many as 300 players with no height or weight restrictions, or protective gear. The goals could be from around 200 feet (61 m) apart to about 2 miles (3.2 km); in lacrosse the field is 110 yards (100 m).

==== Individual sports ====
Chunkey was a game that consisted of a stone-shaped disk about 1–2 inches in diameter. The disk was thrown down a 200-foot (61 m) corridor so it could roll past the players at great speed. Players would throw wooden shafts at the moving disk. The object of the game was to strike the disk or prevent your opponents from hitting it.

==== U.S. Olympics ====
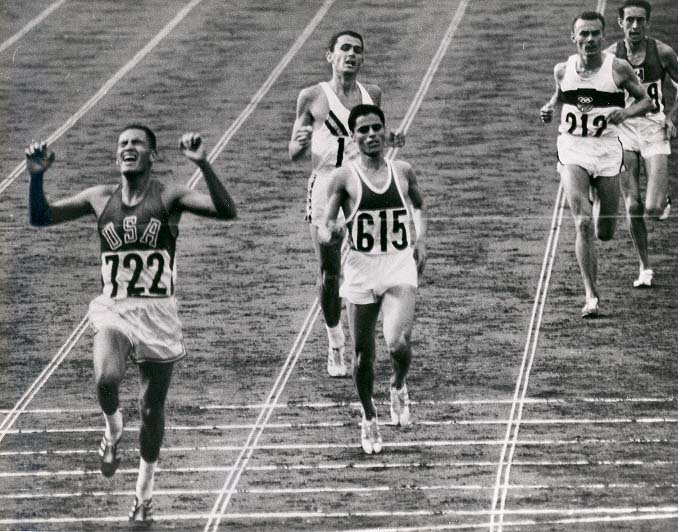
Billy Mills crosses the finish line at the end of the 10,000-meter race at the 1964 Tokyo Olympics.

Jim Thorpe, a Sauk and Fox Native American, was an all-around athlete playing football and baseball in the early 20th century. Future President Dwight Eisenhower injured his knee while trying to tackle the young Thorpe. In a 1961 speech, Eisenhower recalled Thorpe: "Here and there, there are some people who are supremely endowed. My memory goes back to Jim Thorpe. He never practiced in his life, and he could do anything better than any other football player I ever saw."

In the 1912 Olympics, Thorpe ran the 100-yard dash in 10 seconds flat, the 220 in 21.8 seconds, the 440 in 51.8 seconds, the 880 in 1:57, the mile in 4:35, the 120-yard high hurdles in 15 seconds, and the 220-yard low hurdles in 24 seconds. He long jumped 23 ft 6 in and high-jumped 6 ft 5 in. He pole vaulted 11 feet (3.4 m), put the shot 47 ft 9 in (14.55 m), throw the javelin 163 feet (50 m), and the discus 136 feet (41 m). Thorpe entered the U.S. Olympic trials for the pentathlon and the decathlon.

Louis Tewanima, Hopi people, was an American two-time Olympic distance runner and silver medalist in the 10,000-meters in 1912. He ran for the Carlisle Indian School where he was a teammate of Thorpe. His silver in 1912 remained the best US achievement in this event until another Indian, Billy Mills, won gold in 1964. Tewanima competed at the 1908 Olympics, where he finished 9th in the marathon.

Ellison Brown, of the Narragansett people from Rhode Island, won two Boston Marathons (1936, 1939) and competed in the 1936 Olympics in Berlin, but did not finish due to injury. He qualified for the 1940 Olympic Games in Helsinki, but the games were canceled due to the outbreak of World War II.

Billy Mills, a Lakota and USMC officer, won gold in the 10,000-meters at the 1964 Tokyo Olympics. He was the only American ever to win the gold in this event.

Billy Kidd, part Abenaki from Vermont, became the first American man to medal in alpine skiing in the Olympics, taking silver in the slalom in the 1964 Winter Olympics at Innsbruck, Austria. Six years later at the 1970 World Championships, Kidd won gold in the combined event and bronze in the slalom.

Ashton Locklear (Lumbee), an uneven bars specialist, was an alternate for the 2016 Summer Olympics U.S. gymnastics team, the Final Five. In 2016, Kyrie Irving (Sioux) also helped Team USA win gold at the 2016 Summer Olympics. He became the 4th member of Team USA to capture the NBA championship and Olympic gold in the same year, joining LeBron James, Michael Jordan, and Scottie Pippen.

=== Literature ===
Native American literature, composed of oral and written literature, has a long history. It is considered a series of literatures reflecting the varied traditions and histories of different tribes. Modern authors cover a range of genres and include Tommy Orange, Joy Harjo, Louise Erdrich, Stephen Graham Jones, Rebecca Roanhorse, Tommy Pico, and many more.

=== Music ===
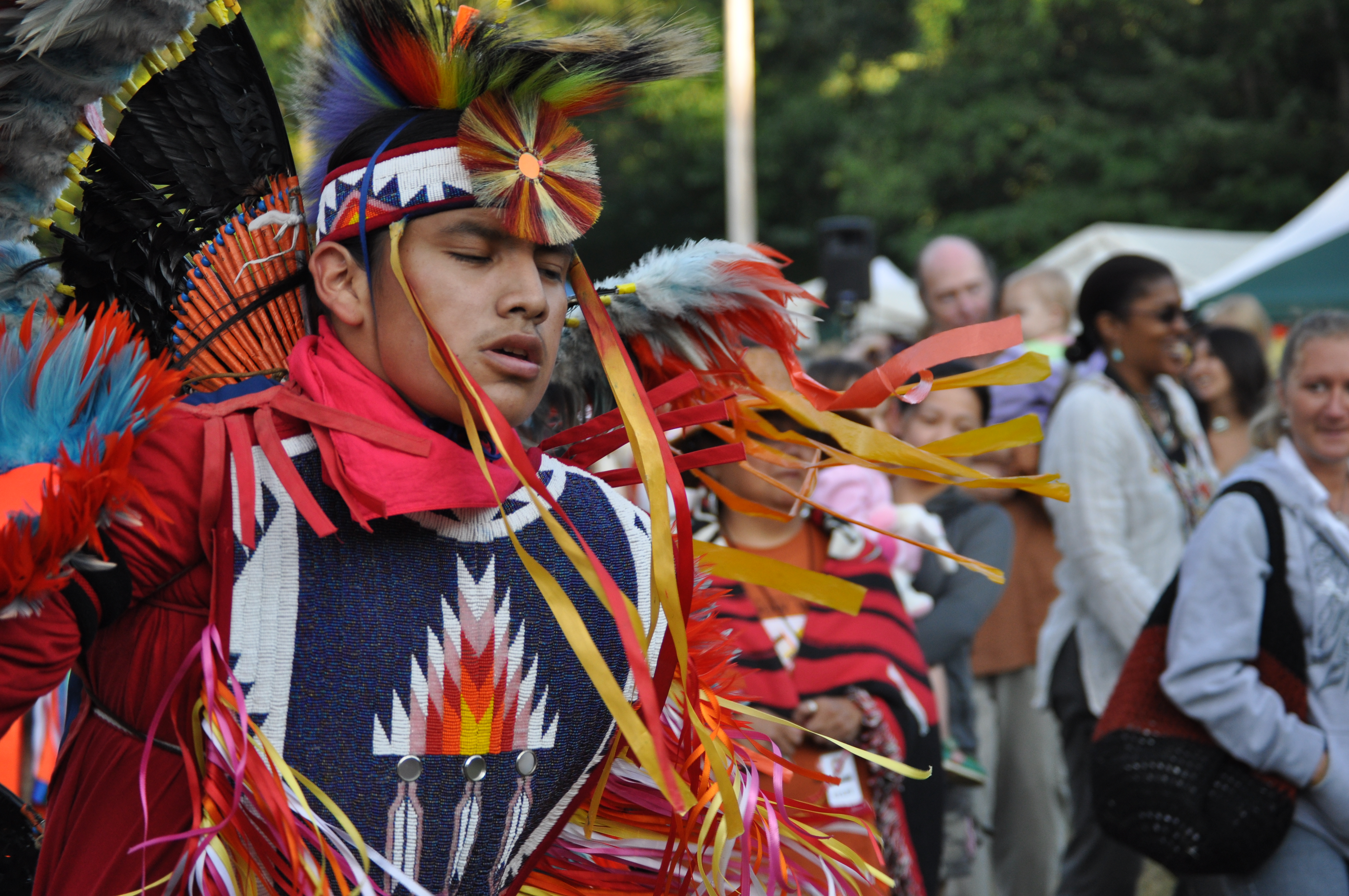
Fancy Dancer at the Seafair Indian Days Pow-Wow, Daybreak Star Cultural Center, Seattle, Washington

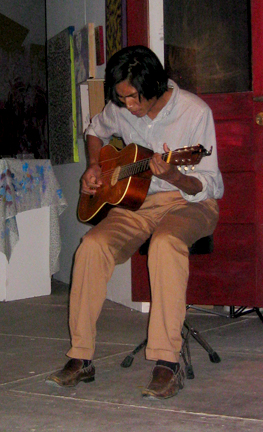
Jake Fragua, Jemez Pueblo from New Mexico

Traditional Native American music is almost entirely monophonic, but there are exceptions. It often includes drums, rattles, or other percussion, but little other instrumentation. Flutes and whistles made of wood, cane, or bone are also played, generally by individuals, but in former times also by large ensembles, as noted by conquistador de Soto. The tuning of modern flutes is typically pentatonic.

Performers with Native American parentage have occasionally appeared in American popular music such as Rita Coolidge, Wayne Newton, Gene Clark, Blackfoot, and Redbone. Some, such as John Trudell, have used music to comment on life in Native America. Others such as R. Carlos Nakai, Joanne Shenandoah and Robert "Tree" Cody integrate traditional sounds with modern, in instrumental recordings, whereas music by Charles Littleleaf is derived from ancestral heritage as well as nature. Recording companies offer an abundance of music by contemporary Native American performers young and old, ranging from pow-wow drum music to rock-and-roll and rap. In the ballet dancing Maria Tallchief was considered America's first major prima ballerina, and the first of Native American descent to hold the rank. Along with her sister Marjorie Tallchief both became star ballerinas.

The most widely practiced public musical form among Native Americans is that of the pow-wow. At pow-wows, such as the annual Gathering of Nations in Albuquerque, New Mexico, members of drum groups sit in a circle around a large drum. Drum groups play in unison while they sing and dancers in colorful regalia dance clockwise around the drum groups. Familiar pow-wow songs include honor songs, intertribal songs, crow-hops, sneak-up songs, grass-dances, two-steps, welcome songs, going-home songs, and war songs. Most Indigenous communities maintain traditional songs and ceremonies, some of which are shared and practiced exclusively within the community.

=== Art ===
The Haudenosaunee, living around the Great Lakes and extending east and north, used strings or belts called wampum that served a dual function: the knots and beaded designs mnemonically chronicled tribal stories and legends, and served as a medium of exchange and unit of measure. The keepers of the articles were seen as tribal dignitaries.

Pueblo peoples crafted impressive items associated with their religious ceremonies. Kachina dancers wore elaborately painted and decorated masks as they ritually impersonated ancestral spirits. Pueblo people are noted for high-quality pottery, often with geometric designs and floral, animal and bird motifs. Carved stone and wood fetishes were made for religious use. Superior weaving, embroidered decorations, and rich dyes characterized their textile arts. Turquoise and shell jewelry were created, as were formalized pictorial arts.

Navajo spirituality focused on the maintenance of a harmonious relationship with the spirit world, often achieved by ceremonial acts, usually incorporating sandpainting. For the Navajo, sand painting is not just a representational object, but a spiritual entity with a life of its own, which helped the patient at the center of the ceremony re-establish a connection with the life force. These sand creations were erased at the end of the healing ceremony.

It has been estimated that the Native American arts and crafts industry brings in a billion USD in gross sales annually. Native American art comprises a major category in the world art collection. Native American contributions include pottery, paintings, jewellery, weavings, sculpture, basketry, and carvings. The integrity of certain Native American artworks is protected by the Indian Arts and Crafts Act of 1990, which prohibits the representation of art as Native American when it is not the product of an enrolled Native American artist. Gail Sheffield and others claim this has had "the unintended consequence of sanctioning discrimination against Native Americans whose tribal affiliation was not officially recognized". Artists such as Jeanne Rorex Bridges (Echota Cherokee), who was not enrolled, ran the risk of fines or imprisonment if they sold their art while affirming their heritage.

Notable Native American artists include Franklin Gritts, a Cherokee artist who taught students from many tribes at Haskell Institute (now Haskell Indian Nations University) in the 1940s, the Golden Age of Native American painters.

== Interracial relations ==
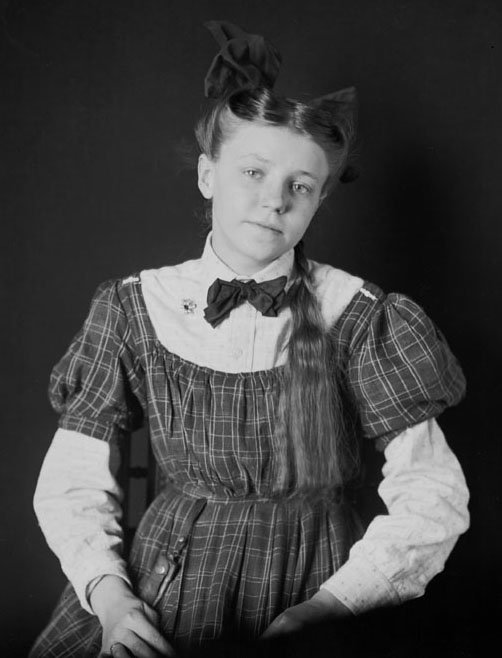
Lillian Gross, described as a "Mixed Blood" by the Smithsonian source, was of Cherokee and European American heritage. She identified with the Cherokee culture in which she was raised.

Interracial relations between Native Americans, Europeans, and Africans is a complex issue that has been mostly neglected with "few in-depth studies on interracial relationships". Native Americans are more likely than any other racial group to practice interracial or intertribal marriage among the different tribes and non-Natives, resulting in an ever-declining proportion of Indigenous blood among those who claim a Native American identity (tribes often count only the Indian blood from their own tribal background in the enrollment process, disregarding intertribal heritages).

=== Assimilation ===
European impact was immediate, widespread, and profound already during the early years of colonization and the creation of the countries which currently exist in the Americas. Europeans living among Native Americans were often called "white indians". They "lived in native communities for years, learned native languages fluently, attended native councils, and often fought alongside their native companions".

Early contact was often charged with tension and emotion, but also had moments of friendship, cooperation, and intimacy. Marriages took place in English, French, Russian and Spanish colonies between Native Americans and Europeans though Native American women were also the victims of rape.

There was fear on both sides, as the different peoples realized how different their societies were. Many whites regarded Native people as "savages" because the Native people were not Protestant or Roman Catholic and therefore the Native people were not considered to be human beings. The Native American author, Andrew J. Blackbird, wrote in his History of the Ottawa and Chippewa Indians of Michigan (1897), that white settlers introduced some immoralities into Native American tribes. Many Native Americans suffered because the Europeans introduced alcohol. Many Native people do not break down alcohol in the same way as people of Eurasian background. Many Native people were learning what their body could tolerate of this new substance and died as a result of imbibing too much.

Blackbird wrote:

The Ottawas and Chippewas were quite virtuous in their primitive state, as there were no illegitimate children reported in our old traditions. But very lately this evil came to exist among the Ottawas-so lately that the second case among the Ottawas of 'Arbor Croche' is yet living in 1897. And from that time this evil came to be quite frequent, for immorality has been introduced among these people by evil white persons who bring their vices into the tribes.

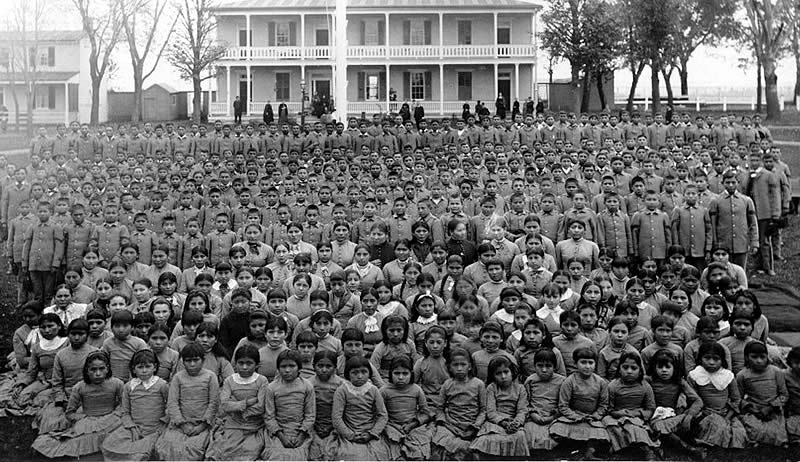
The Carlisle Indian Industrial School was a major institution for the assimilation of Native Americans. From 1879 until 1918, over 10,000 children from 140 tribes attended Carlisle. Founded by Richard Henry Pratt, his motto, "Kill the Indian, Save the Man", was in reference to the ethics of the school and efforts to eradicate Indigenous culture and forcibly assimilate the Natives into white American culture, and that "the goal of acculturation was to be accomplished by "total immersion" in the white man's world."

The U.S. government had two purposes when making land agreements with Native Americans: to open up more land for white settlement, and to "ease tensions" (in other words assimilate Native people to Eurasian social ways) between whites and Native Americans by forcing the Native Americans to use the land in the same way as did the whites—for subsistence farms. The government used a variety of strategies to achieve these goals; many treaties required Native Americans to become farmers in order to keep their land. Government officials often did not translate the documents which Native Americans were forced to sign, and native chiefs often had little or no idea what they were signing.

For a Native American man to marry a white woman, he had to get consent of her parents, as long as "he can prove to support her as a white woman in a good home". In the early 19th century, the Shawnee Tecumseh and blonde hair, blue-eyed Rebecca Galloway had an interracial affair. In the late 19th century, three European American middle-class women teachers at Hampton Institute married Native American men whom they had met as students.

As European American women started working independently at missions and Indian schools in the western states, there were more opportunities for their meeting and developing relationships with Native American men. For instance, Charles Eastman, a man of European and Lakota origin whose father sent both his sons to Dartmouth College, got his medical degree at Boston University and returned to the West to practice.

== European enslavement ==
The majority of Native American tribes did practice some form of slavery before the European introduction of African slavery into North America, but none exploited slave labor on a large scale. Most Native American tribes did not barter captives in the pre-colonial era, although they sometimes exchanged enslaved individuals with other tribes in peace gestures or in exchange for their own members. When Europeans arrived as colonists in North America, Native Americans changed their practice of slavery dramatically. Native Americans began selling war captives to Europeans rather than integrating them into their own societies as they had done before. As the demand for labor in the West Indies grew with the cultivation of sugar cane, Europeans enslaved Native Americans for the Thirteen Colonies, and some were exported to the "sugar islands". The British settlers, especially those in the southern colonies, purchased or captured Native Americans to use as forced labor in cultivating tobacco, rice, and indigo. Accurate records of the numbers enslaved do not exist because vital statistics and census reports were at best infrequent. Scholars estimate tens to hundreds of thousands of Native Americans may have been enslaved by the Europeans, being sold by Native Americans themselves or Europeans.

In Colonial America, slavery soon became racialized, with those enslaved by the institution consisting of ethnic groups (non-Christian Native Americans and Africans) who were foreign to the Christian, European colonists. The House of Burgesses define the terms of slavery in Virginia in 1705:

All servants imported and brought into the Country ... who were not Christians in their native Country ... shall be accounted and be slaves. All Negro, mulatto and Indian slaves within this dominion ... shall be held to be real estate. If any slave resists his master ... correcting such slave, and shall happen to be killed in such correction ... the master shall be free of all punishment ... as if such accident never happened.

— Virginia General Assembly declaration, 1705

The slave trade of Native Americans lasted only until around 1750. It gave rise to a series of devastating wars among the tribes, including the Yamasee War. The Indian Wars of the early 18th century, combined with the increasing importation of African slaves, effectively ended the Native American slave trade by 1750. Colonists found that Native American slaves could easily escape, as they knew the country. The wars cost the lives of numerous colonial slave traders and disrupted their early societies. The remaining Native American groups banded together to face the Europeans from a position of strength. Many surviving Native American peoples of the southeast strengthened their loose coalitions of language groups and joined confederacies such as the Choctaw, the Creek, and the Catawba for protection. Even after the Indian Slave Trade ended in 1750, the enslavement of Native Americans continued (mostly through kidnappings) in the west and in the Southern states. Both Native American and African enslaved women suffered rape and sexual harassment by male slaveholders and other white men.

== Race, ethnicity, and citizenship ==
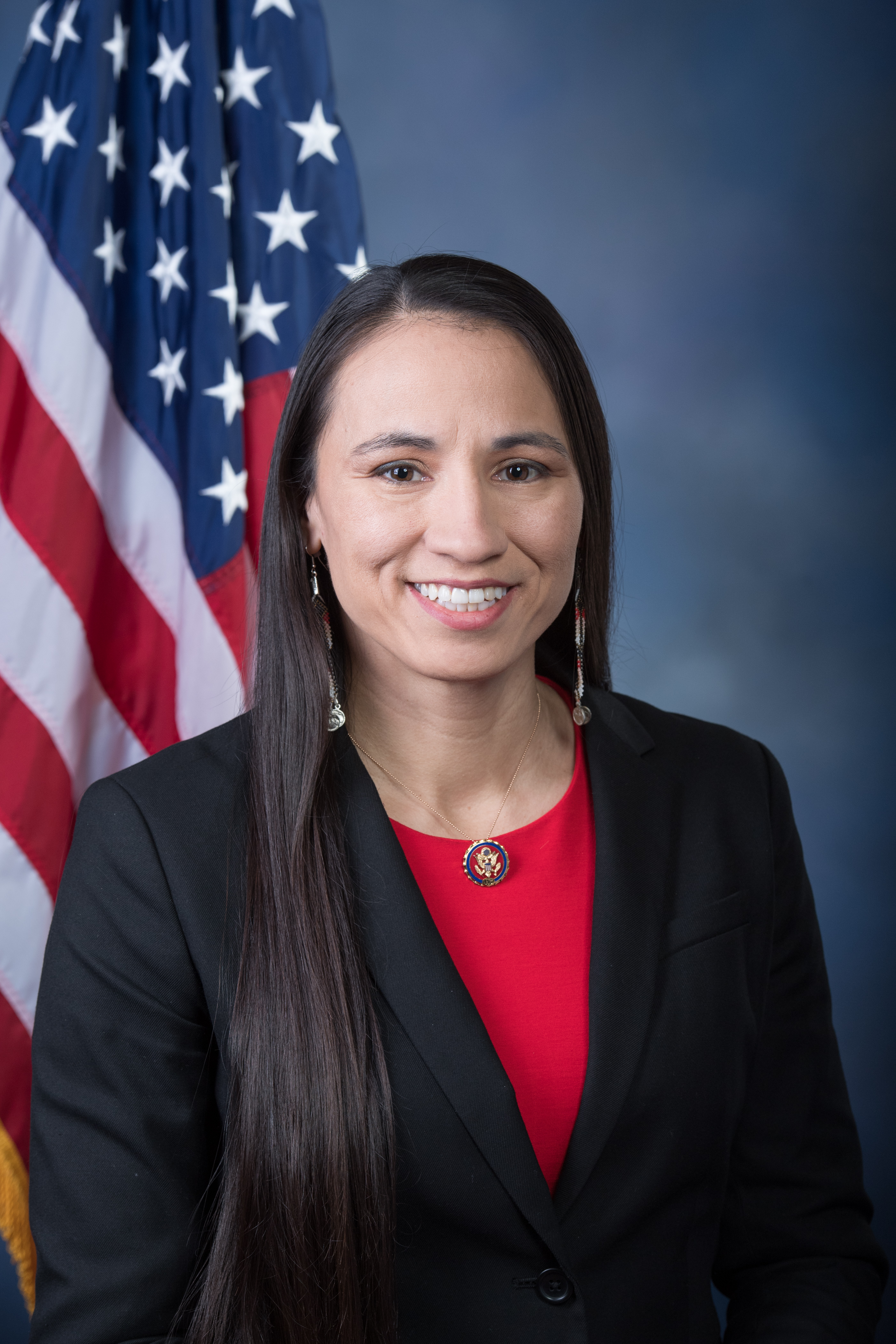
Sharice Davids became one of the first two Native American women elected to the U.S. House of Representatives.

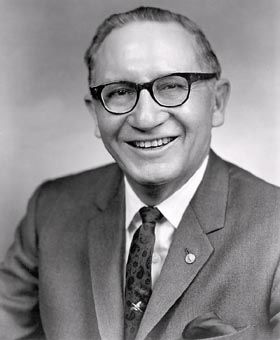
Ben Reifel of South Dakota, the only Lakota elected to the U.S. House of Representatives

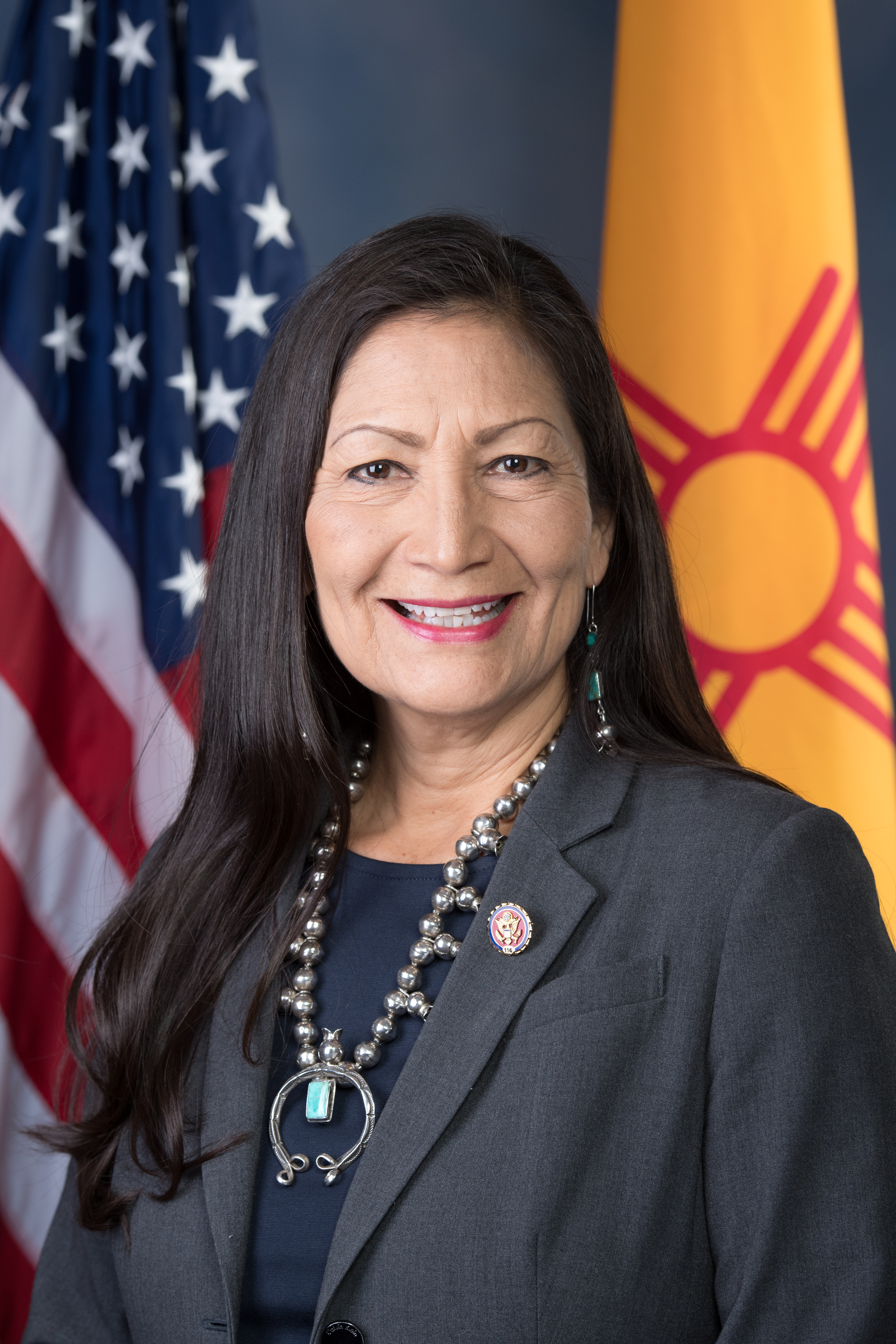
Deb Haaland became the first Native American to be appointed as the U.S. Secretary of the Interior.

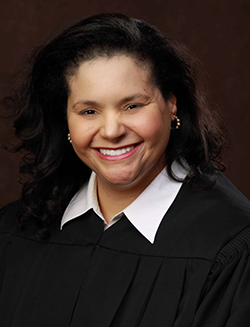
Ada Brown, a citizen of the Choctaw Nation with mixed–African American heritage, nominated by President Donald Trump in 2019 to be a federal judge in Texas

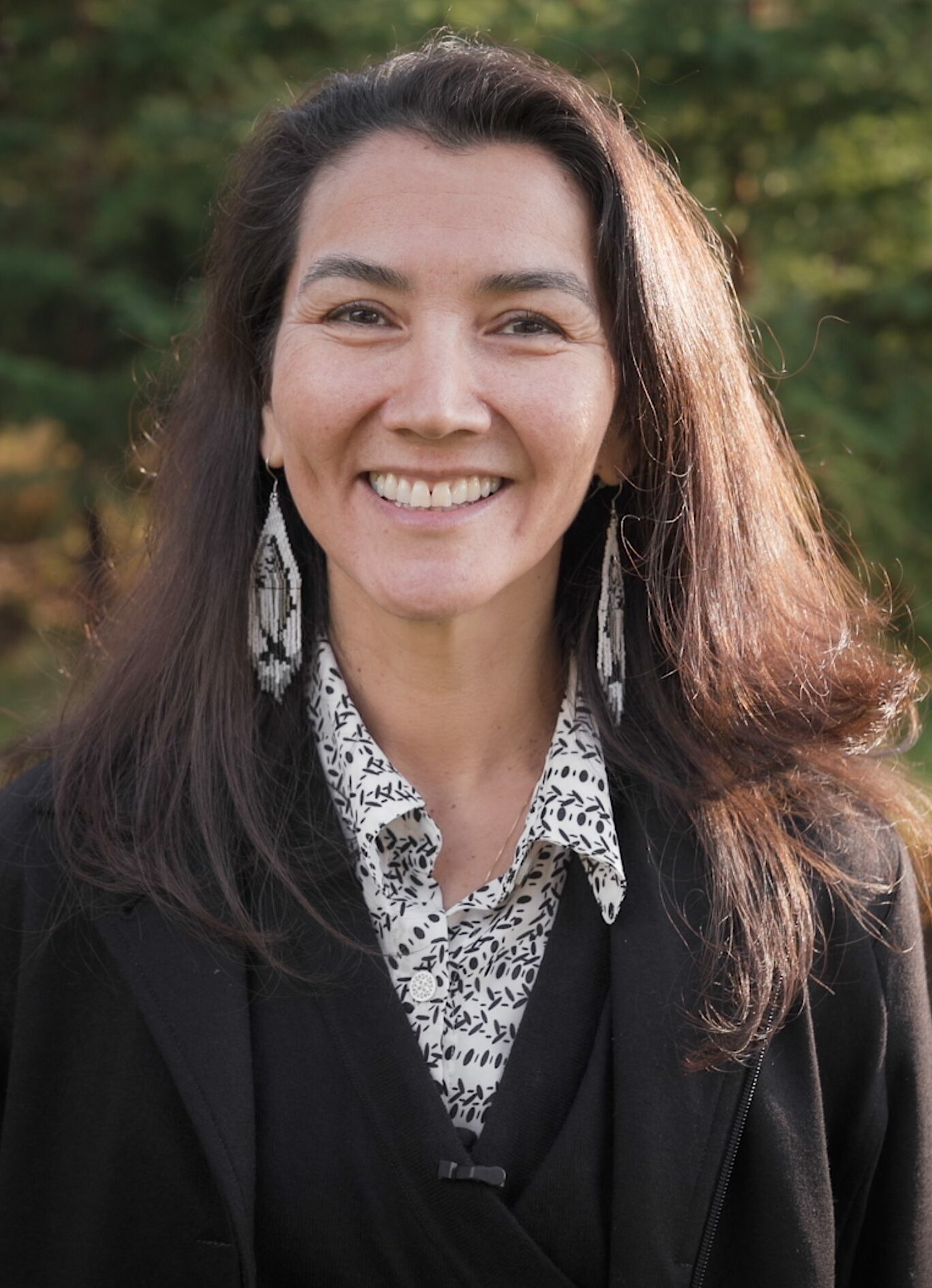
Mary Peltola became the first Alaska Native elected to the U.S. House of Representatives.

Native American identity is determined by the tribal community that the individual or group is seeking to identify with. While it is common for non-Natives to consider it a racial or ethnic identity, it is considered by Native Americans in the United States to be a political identity, based on citizenship and immediate family relationships. As culture can vary widely between the 574 extant federally recognized tribes in the United States, the idea of a single unified "Native American" racial identity is a European construct that does not have an equivalent in tribal thought.

Historically, numerous Native Americans assimilated into colonial and later American society, e.g. through adopting English and converting to Christianity. In many cases, this process occurred through forced assimilation of children sent off to American Indian boarding schools far from their families. Those who could eventually pass for white gained the advantage of white privilege, yet often paid for it with the loss of community connections. With the enforcement of blood quantum laws, Indian blood could be diluted over generations through intermarrying with non-Native populations, as well as intermarrying with members of tribes that also required high blood-quantum, solely from one tribe. "Kill the Indian, save the man" was a mantra of nineteenth-century U.S. assimilation policies.

=== Tribal enrollment ===
Requirements for tribal citizenship vary by tribe, but are generally based on who one's parents and grandparents are, as known and documented by community members and tribal records. Among the tribal nations, qualification for enrolling those who were not logged at birth by their parents may be based upon a required percentage of Native American "blood" (or the "blood quantum") of an individual, or upon documented lineal descent from an ancestor on a specific census or register.

Tribal rules regarding the recognition of members who have heritage from multiple tribes also vary, but most do not allow citizenship in multiple tribes at once. For those that do, usually citizens consider one of their citizenships primary, and their other heritage to be "descent". Federally recognized tribes do not accept genetic ethnicity percentages results as appropriate evidence of Native American identity, as they cannot indicate specific tribe, or even whether or not someone is Native American. Unless requested for a paternity test, they do not advise applicants to submit such things.

=== Increased self-identification ===
In the 2010 Census, nearly 3 million people indicated that their "race" was Native American (including Alaska Native). Of these, more than 27% specifically indicated "Cherokee" as their ethnic origin. This phenomenon has been dubbed the "Cherokee Syndrome". Across the US, numerous individuals cultivate an opportunistic ethnic identity as Native American, sometimes through Cherokee heritage groups or Indian Wedding Blessings.

Since the 2000 census, people may identify as being of more than one race. Since the 1960s, the number of people claiming Native American ancestry has grown significantly and, by the 2000 census, the number had more than doubled. Sociologists attribute this dramatic change to "ethnic shifting" or "ethnic shopping"; they believe that it reflects a willingness of people to question their birth identities and adopt new ethnicities which they find more compatible.

The author Jack Hitt writes:

The reaction from lifelong Indians runs the gamut. It is easy to find Native Americans who denounce many of these new Indians as members of the wannabe tribe. But it is also easy to find Indians like Clem Iron Wing, an elder among the Lakota, who sees this flood of new ethnic claims as magnificent, a surge of Indians 'trying to come home.' Those Indians who ridicule Iron Wing's lax sense of tribal membership have retrofitted the old genocidal system of blood quantum—measuring racial purity by blood—into the new standard for real Indianness, a choice rich with paradox.

Journalist Mary Annette Pember (Ojibwe) writes that non-Natives identifying with Native American identity may be a result of a person's increased interest in genealogy, the romanticization of what they believe the cultures to be, and family lore of Native American ancestors in the distant past. However, there are different issues if a person wants to pursue enrollment as a citizen of a tribal nation. Different tribes have different requirements for citizenship. Often those who live as non-Natives, yet claim distant heritage, say they are simply reluctant to enroll, arguing that it is a method of control initiated by the federal government. However, it is the tribes that set their own enrollment criteria, and "the various enrollment requirements are often a hurdle that ethnic shoppers are unable to clear." Says Grayson Noley, (Choctaw), of the University of Oklahoma, "If you have to search for proof of your heritage, it probably isn't there." In other cases, there are some individuals who are 100% Native American but, if all of their recent ancestors are from different tribes, blood quantum laws could result in them not meeting the citizenship criteria for any one of those individual tribes. Pember concludes:

The subjects of genuine American Indian blood, cultural connection and recognition by the community are extremely contentious issues, hotly debated throughout Indian country and beyond. The whole situation, some say, is ripe for misinterpretation, confusion and, ultimately, exploitation.

== DNA ==
The genetic history of Indigenous peoples of the Americas primarily focuses on human Y-chromosome DNA haplogroups and human mitochondrial DNA haplogroups. "Y-DNA" is passed solely along the patrilineal line, from father to son, while "mtDNA" is passed down the matrilineal line, from mother to offspring of both sexes. Neither recombines, and thus Y-DNA and mtDNA change only by chance mutation at each generation with no intermixture between parents' genetic material. Autosomal "atDNA" markers are also used, but differ from mtDNA or Y-DNA in that they overlap significantly. Autosomal DNA is generally used to measure the average continent-of-ancestry genetic admixture in the entire human genome and related isolated populations. Within mtDNA, genetic scientists have found specific nucleotide sequences that they have classified as "Native American markers" because the sequences are understood to have been inherited through the generations of genetic females within populations first found in the "New World". There are five primary Native American mtDNA haplogroups in which there are clusters of closely linked markers inherited together. All five haplogroups have been identified by researchers as "prehistoric Native North American samples", and it is commonly asserted that the majority of living Native Americans possess one of the common five mtDNA haplogroup markers.

The genetic pattern indicates Indigenous Americans experienced two very distinctive genetic episodes; first with the initial-peopling of the Americas, and secondly with European colonization of the Americas. The former is the determinant factor for the number of gene lineages, zygosity mutations and founding haplotypes present in today's Indigenous American populations.

The most popular theory is that human settlement of the Americas occurred in stages from the Bering sea coast line, with an initial 15,000 to 20,000-year layover on Beringia for the small founding population. The micro-satellite diversity and distributions of the Y lineage specific to South America indicates that certain Amerindian populations have been isolated since the initial colonization of the region. The Na-Dené, Inuit and Indigenous Alaskan populations exhibit haplogroup Q-M242 (Y-DNA) mutations, however, that are distinct from other Indigenous Amerindians, and that have various mtDNA and atDNA mutations. This suggests that the paleo-Indian migrants into the northern extremes of North America and Greenland were descended from a later, independent migrant population.

Genetic analyses of HLA I and HLA II genes as well as HLA-A, -B, and -DRB1 gene frequencies links the Ainu people of northern Japan and southeastern Russia to some Indigenous peoples of the Americas, especially to populations on the Pacific Northwest Coast such as Tlingit. Scientists suggest that the main ancestor of the Ainu and of some Native American groups can be traced back to Paleolithic groups in Southern Siberia.

== See also ==
- American Indians in World War I
- List of historical Indian reservations in the United States
- List of Indian massacres in North America
- List of Indian reservations in the United States
- List of Native American firsts
- List of Native Americans of the United States (notable Native Americans)
- List of U.S. communities with Native-American majority populations
