= White supremacy =

Belief in the superiority of white people

White supremacy is the belief that white people are superior to those of other races. The belief favors the maintenance and defense of any power and privilege held by white people. White supremacy has roots in the now-discredited doctrine of scientific racism and was a key justification for European colonialism.

As a political ideology, it imposes and maintains cultural, social, political, historical or institutional domination by white people and non-white supporters. In the past, this ideology had been put into effect through socioeconomic and legal structures such as the Atlantic slave trade, European colonial labor and social practices, the Scramble for Africa, Jim Crow laws in the United States, the activities of the Native Land Court in New Zealand, the White Australia policies from the 1890s to the mid-1970s, and apartheid in South Africa. This ideology is also today present among neo-Confederates.

White supremacy underlies a spectrum of contemporary movements including white nationalism, white separatism, neo-Nazism, and the Christian Identity movement. In the United States, white supremacy is primarily associated with Aryan Nations, White Aryan Resistance, and the Ku Klux Klan. The Proud Boys are considered an implicitly white supremacist organization, despite denying their association with white supremacy. In recent years, websites such as X (formerly Twitter) and Stormfront have contributed to an increased activity and interest in white supremacy.

Not all white-supremacist organizations have the same objectives, and while some may uphold a Nordicist ideal of whiteness, others are more broadly white supremacist, including members of Southern European and Eastern European descent. Different groups of white supremacists identify various racial, ethnic, religious, and other enemies, most commonly those of Sub-Saharan African ancestry, Indigenous peoples, people of Asian descent, multiracial people, Middle Eastern and North African people, Jews, Muslims, and LGBTQ+ people.

In academic usage, particularly in critical race theory or intersectionality, "white supremacy" also refers to a social system in which white people enjoy structural advantages (privilege) over other ethnic groups, on both a collective and individual level, despite formal legal equality.

== History ==
White supremacy has ideological foundations that date back to 18th-century scientific racism, the predominant paradigm of human variation that shaped international relations and racial policy from the latter part of the Age of Enlightenment until the late 20th century.

=== United States ===
==== Early history ====
White supremacy was dominant in the United States both before and after the American Civil War, and it persisted for decades after the Reconstruction era. The Virginia Slave Codes of 1705 socially segregated white colonists from black enslaved persons, making them disparate groups and hindering their ability to unite. Unity of the commoners was a perceived fear of the Virginian planter gentry, who wished to prevent repeated events such as Bacon's Rebellion, occurring 29 years prior. Prior to the Civil War, many wealthy white Southerners owned slaves; they tried to justify their economic exploitation of black people by creating a "scientific" theory of white superiority and black inferiority. One such slave owner, future president Thomas Jefferson, wrote in 1785 that blacks were "inferior to the whites in the endowments of body and mind." In the antebellum South, four million slaves were denied freedom. The outbreak of the Civil War saw the desire to uphold white supremacy being cited as a cause for state secession and the formation of the Confederate States of America.

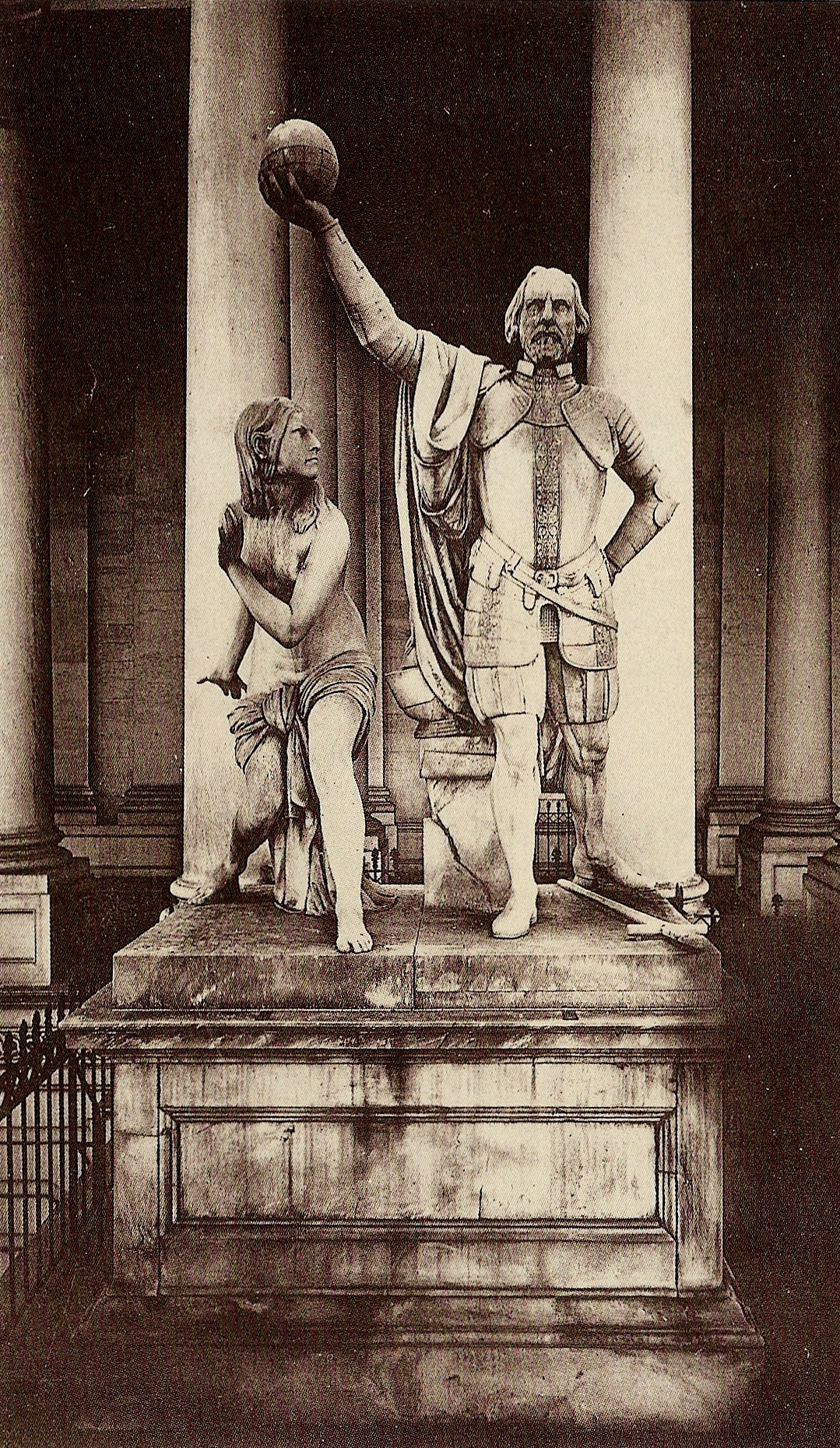
The Discovery of America (1844) sculpture, depicting a triumphant Columbus and a "female savage" (Native woman), which stood outside the U.S. Capitol

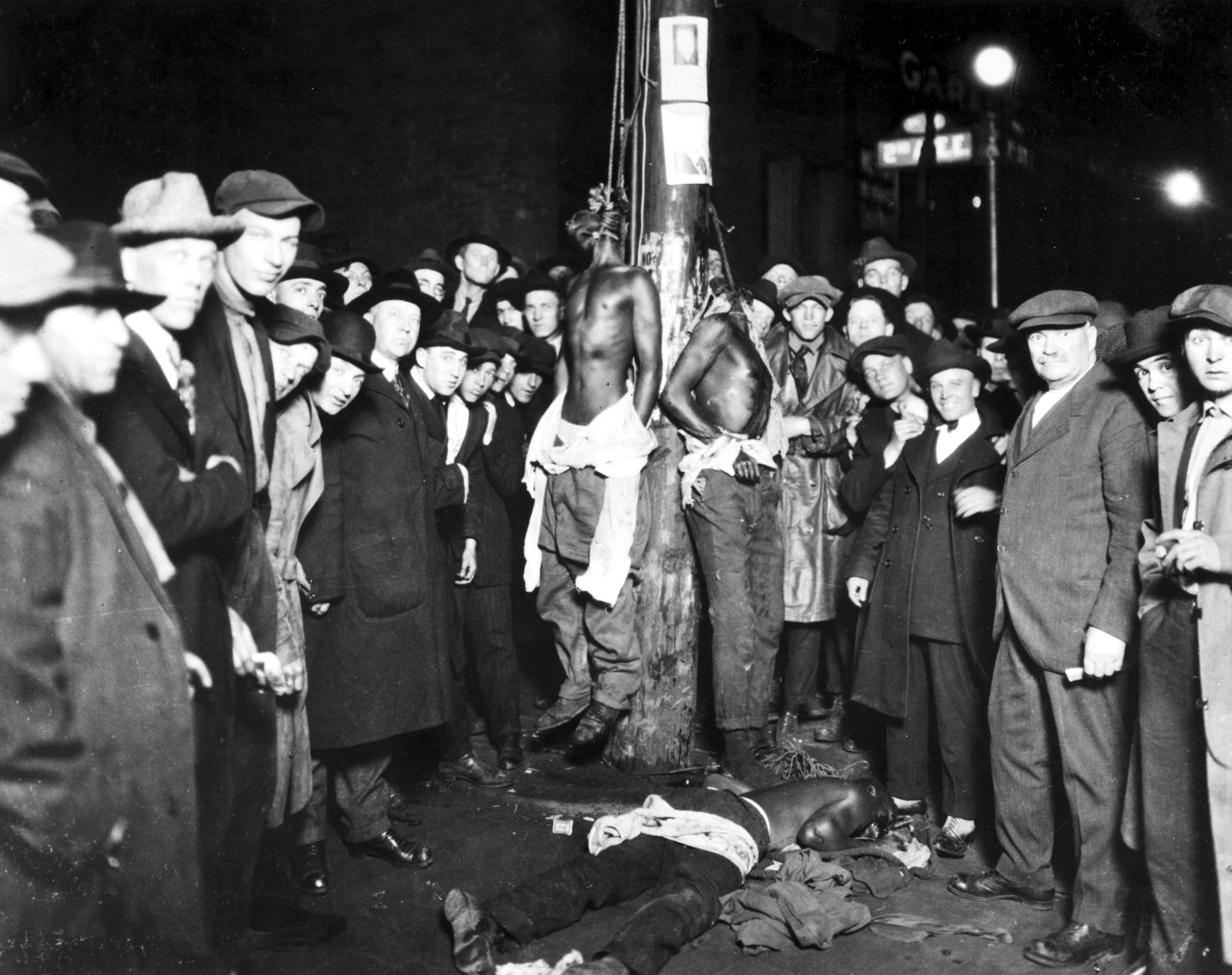
White men pose for a photograph of the 1920 Duluth, Minnesota lynchings. Two of the black victims are still hanging while the third is on the ground. Lynchings were often public spectacles for the white community to celebrate white supremacy in the U.S., and photos were often sold as postcards.

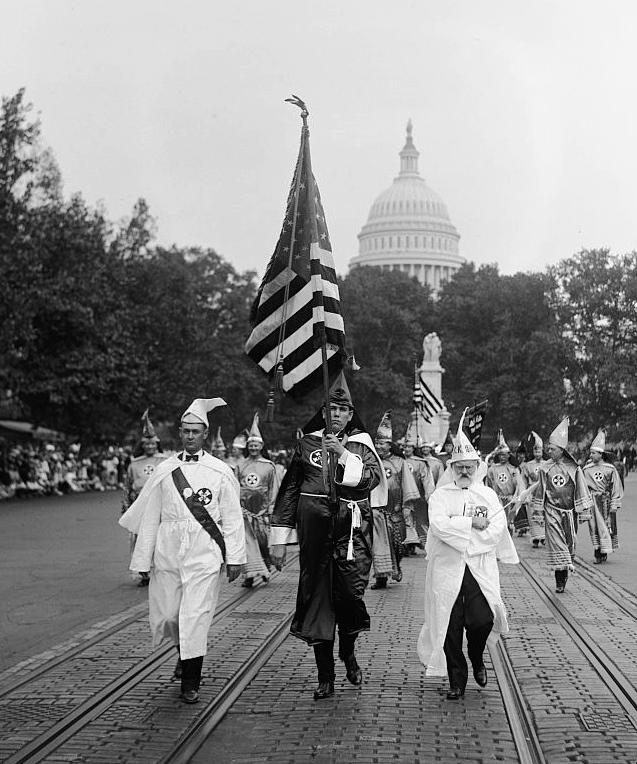
Ku Klux Klan parade in Washington, D.C. in 1926

Native Americans had been dehumanized as "merciless Indian savages" in the United States Declaration of Independence, and in Martin Luther King Jr.'s 1964 book Why We Can't Wait he wrote: "Our nation was born in genocide when it embraced the doctrine that the original American, the Indian, was an inferior race." Two sculptures reflecting the view of the Natives espoused in the declaration were commissioned by the U.S. government and stood outside the U.S. Capitol from 1844 to 1958: The Discovery of America, which depicted a triumphant Columbus and a "female savage" according to the Pennsylvania senator James Buchanan who proposed the sculpture, and The Rescue, whose sculptor Horatio Greenough wrote that it was "to convey the idea of the triumph of the whites over the savage tribes". In an 1890 editorial about the Natives and the American Indian Wars, author L. Frank Baum wrote: "The Whites, by law of conquest, by justice of civilization, are masters of the American continent, and the best safety of the frontier settlements will be secured by the total annihilation of the few remaining Indians."

The Naturalization Act of 1790 limited U.S. citizenship to whites only. In some parts of the United States, many people who were considered non-white were disenfranchised, barred from government office, and prevented from holding most government jobs well into the second half of the 20th century. Professor Leland T. Saito of the University of Southern California writes: "Throughout the history of the United States, race has been used by whites for legitimizing and creating difference and social, economic and political exclusion."

19th century

A belief in racial purity and white supremacy were among the reasons for the anti-miscegenation laws in the U.S., with Abraham Lincoln stating in an 1858 speech, "I am not, nor ever have been in favor of making voters or jurors of negroes, nor of qualifying them to hold office, nor to intermarry with white people. I as much as any man am in favor of the superior position assigned to the white race." By the late 1800s, 38 U.S. states had laws banning interracial marriage.

Benjamin Tillman was a white supremacist former U.S. governor and senator who participated and boasted about the lynchings of Black Americans, and defended on the floor of the U.S. Senate. Rebecca Latimer Felton, a white supremacist and the first woman to serve in the U.S. Senate, gave a speech calling for the lynching of Black men.

==== 20th century ====
A series of U.S politicians continued to advocate and agitate towards White supremacy. An example being an Elected Governor of Mississippi, James K. Vardaman, who used the term White Supremacy verbatim when he said "If it is necessary every Negro in the state will be lynched; it will be done to maintain white supremacy."

Eugene Talmadge was a white supremacist who was elected four times as the governor of Georgia. His opponent, Ellis Gibbs Arnall, once noted that nobody could beat Talmadge in what he cynically called the "nigger-hating contest". Both were white supremacists and anti-black, but Arnall was less crude about it.

The denial of social and political freedom to minorities continued into the mid-20th century, resulting in the civil rights movement. The movement was spurred by the lynching of Emmett Till, a 14-year-old boy. David Jackson writes it was the image of the "murdered child's ravaged body, that forced the world to reckon with the brutality of American racism."

Sociologist Stephen Klineberg has stated that U.S. immigration laws prior to 1965 clearly "declared that Northern Europeans are a superior subspecies of the white race". (Note: This quote is by Klineberg in the NPR story, not from the text of any US law.) The Immigration and Nationality Act of 1965 opened entry to the U.S. to non-Germanic groups, and significantly altered the demographic mix in the U.S. as a result. The last 16 states in which interracial marriage was banned had such laws in place until 1967 when they were invalidated by the Supreme Court of the United States' decision in Loving v. Virginia. These mid-century gains had a major impact on white Americans' political views; segregation and white racial superiority, which had been publicly endorsed in the 1940s, became minority views within the white community by the mid-1970s, and continued to decline in 1990s' polls to a single-digit percentage. For sociologist Howard Winant, these shifts marked the end of "monolithic white supremacy" in the United States.

After the mid-1960s, white supremacy remained an important ideology to the American far-right. According to Kathleen Belew, a historian of race and racism in the United States, white militancy shifted after the Vietnam War from supporting the existing racial order to a more radical position (self-described as "white power" or "white nationalism") committed to overthrowing the United States government and establishing a white homeland. Such anti-government militia organizations are one of three major strands of violent right-wing movements in the United States, with white-supremacist groups (such as the Ku Klux Klan, neo-Nazi organizations, and racist skinheads) and a religious fundamentalist movement (such as Christian Identity) being the other two.

==== 21st century ====
The presidential campaign of Donald Trump led to a surge of interest in white supremacy and white nationalism in the United States, bringing increased media attention and new members to their movement; his campaign enjoyed their widespread support.

Some academics argue that the outcome of the 2016 United States presidential election, and the many controversies which surrounded it, reflect the ongoing influence of white supremacy in the United States. Educators, literary theorists, and other political experts have raised similar questions, connecting the scapegoating of disenfranchised populations to white superiority.

=== British Commonwealth ===
There has been debate whether Winston Churchill, who was voted "the greatest ever Briton" in 2002, was "a racist and white supremacist". In the context of rejecting the Arab wish to stop Jewish immigration to Palestine, he said:

I do not admit that the dog in the manger has the final right to the manger, though he may have lain there for a very long time. I do not admit that right. I do not admit for instance that a great wrong has been done to the Red Indians of America or the black people of Australia. I do not admit that a wrong has been done to those people by the fact that a stronger race, a higher-grade race or at any rate a more worldly-wise race ... has come in and taken their place."

British historian Richard Toye, author of Churchill's Empire, concluded that "Churchill did think that white people were superior."

==== South Africa ====
A number of Southern African nations experienced severe racial tension and conflict during global decolonization, particularly as white Africans of European ancestry fought to protect their preferential social and political status. Racial segregation in South Africa began in colonial times under the Dutch Empire. It continued when the British took over the Cape of Good Hope in 1795. Apartheid was introduced as an officially structured policy by the Afrikaner-dominated National Party after the general election of 1948. Apartheid's legislation divided inhabitants into four racial groups – "black", "white", "coloured", and "Indian", with coloured divided into several sub-classifications. In 1970, the Afrikaner-run government abolished non-white political representation, and starting that year black people were deprived of South African citizenship. South Africa abolished apartheid in 1991.

==== Rhodesia ====
In Rhodesia a predominantly white government issued its own unilateral declaration of independence from the United Kingdom in 1965 during an ultimately unsuccessful attempt to avoid majority rule. Following the Rhodesian Bush War which was fought by African nationalists, Rhodesian prime minister Ian Smith acceded to biracial political representation in 1978 and the state achieved recognition from the United Kingdom as Zimbabwe in 1980.

=== Germany ===
Nazism promoted the idea of a superior Germanic people or Aryan race in Germany during the early 20th century. Notions of white supremacy and Aryan racial superiority were combined in the 19th century, with white supremacists maintaining the belief that white people were members of an Aryan "master race" that was superior to other races, particularly the Jews, who were described as the "Semitic race", Slavs, and Gypsies, who they associated with "cultural sterility". Arthur de Gobineau, a French racial theorist and aristocrat, blamed the fall of the ancien régime in France on racial degeneracy caused by racial intermixing, which he argued had destroyed the "purity" of the Nordic or Germanic race. Gobineau's theories, which attracted a strong following in Germany, emphasized the existence of an irreconcilable polarity between Aryan or Germanic peoples and Jewish culture.

As the Nazi Party's chief racial theorist, Alfred Rosenberg oversaw the construction of a human racial "ladder" that justified Hitler's racial and ethnic policies. Rosenberg promoted the Nordic theory, which regarded Nordics as the "master race", superior to all others, including other Aryans (Indo-Europeans). Rosenberg got the racial term Untermensch from the title of Klansman Lothrop Stoddard's 1922 book The Revolt Against Civilization: The Menace of the Under-man. It was later adopted by the Nazis from that book's German version Der Kulturumsturz: Die Drohung des Untermenschen (1925). Rosenberg was the leading Nazi who attributed the concept of the East-European "under man" to Stoddard. An advocate of the U.S. immigration laws that favored Northern Europeans, Stoddard wrote primarily on the alleged dangers posed by "colored" peoples to white civilization, and wrote The Rising Tide of Color Against White World-Supremacy in 1920. In establishing a restrictive entry system for Germany in 1925, Hitler wrote of his admiration for America's immigration laws: "The American Union categorically refuses the immigration of physically unhealthy elements, and simply excludes the immigration of certain races."

German praise for America's institutional racism, previously found in Hitler's Mein Kampf, was continuous throughout the early 1930s. Nazi lawyers were advocates of the use of American models. Race-based U.S. citizenship and anti-miscegenation laws directly inspired the Nazis' two principal Nuremberg racial laws—the Citizenship Law and the Blood Law. To preserve the Aryan or Nordic race, the Nazis introduced the Nuremberg Laws in 1935, which forbade sexual relations and marriages between Germans and Jews, and later between Germans and Romani and Slavs. The Nazis used the Mendelian inheritance theory to argue that social traits were innate, claiming that there was a racial nature associated with certain general traits, such as inventiveness or criminal behavior.

According to the 2012 annual report of Germany's interior intelligence service, the Federal Office for the Protection of the Constitution, at the time there were 26,000 right-wing extremists living in Germany, including 6,000 neo-Nazis.

=== Australia and New Zealand ===
Fifty-one people died from two consecutive terrorist attacks at the Al Noor Mosque and the Linwood Islamic Centre by an Australian white supremacist carried out on March 15, 2019. The terrorist attacks have been described by Prime Minister Jacinda Ardern as "One of New Zealand's darkest days". On August 27, 2020, the shooter was sentenced to life without parole.

In 2016, there was a rise in debate over the appropriateness of the naming of Massey University in Palmerston North after William Massey, whom many historians and critics have described as a white supremacist. Lecturer Steve Elers was a leading proponent of the idea that Massey was an avowed white supremacist, given Massey "made several anti-Chinese racist statements in the public domain" and intensified the New Zealand head tax. In 1921, Massey wrote in the Evening Post: "New Zealanders are probably the purest Anglo-Saxon population in the British Empire. Nature intended New Zealand to be a white man's country, and it must be kept as such. The strain of Polynesian will be no detriment". This is one of many quotes attributed to him regarded as being openly racist.

== Ideologies and movements ==
Supporters of Nordicism consider the "Nordic peoples" to be a superior race. By the early 19th century, white supremacy was attached to emerging theories of racial hierarchy. The German philosopher Arthur Schopenhauer attributed cultural primacy to the white race:

The highest civilization and culture, apart from the ancient Hindus and Egyptians, are found exclusively among the white races; and even with many dark peoples, the ruling caste or race is fairer in colour than the rest and has, therefore, evidently immigrated, for example, the Brahmins, the Incas, and the rulers of the South Sea Islands. All this is due to the fact that necessity is the mother of invention because those tribes that emigrated early to the north, and there gradually became white, had to develop all their intellectual powers and invent and perfect all the arts in their struggle with need, want and misery, which in their many forms were brought about by the climate.

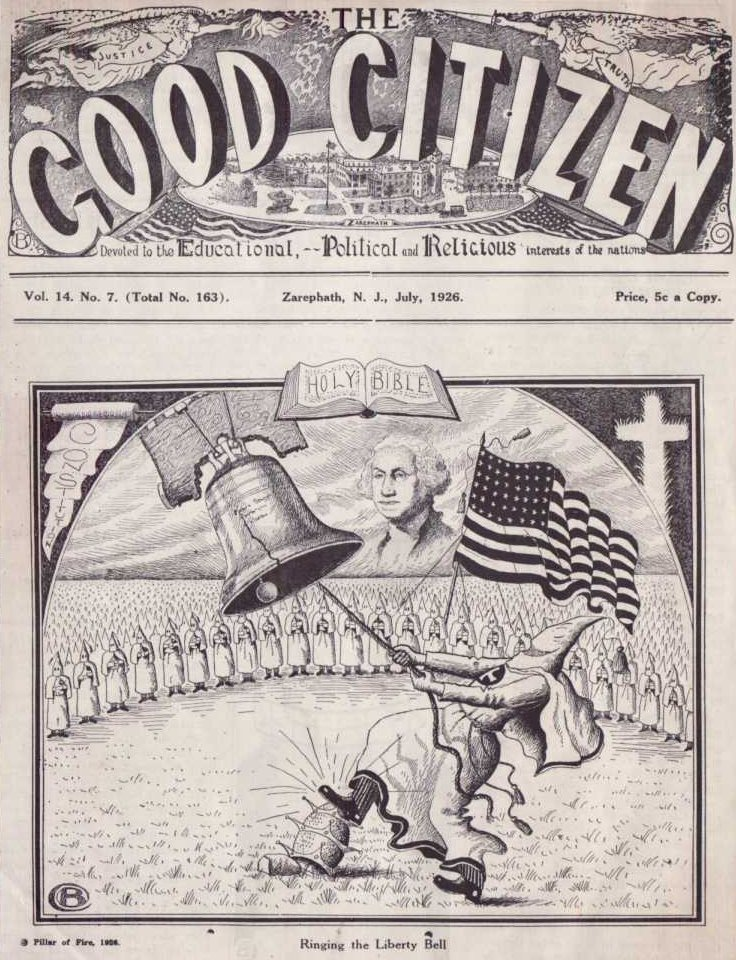
The Good Citizen 1926, published by Pillar of Fire Church

The eugenicist Madison Grant argued in his 1916 book, The Passing of the Great Race, that the Nordic race had been responsible for most of humanity's great achievements, and that admixture was "race suicide". In this book, Europeans who are not of Germanic origin but have Nordic characteristics such as blonde/red hair and blue/green/gray eyes, were considered to be a Nordic admixture and suitable for Aryanization.

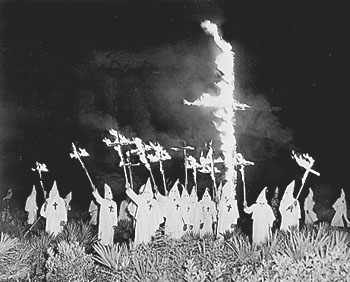
Members of the second Ku Klux Klan at a rally in 1923

In the United States, the groups most associated with the white-supremacist movement are the Ku Klux Klan (KKK), Aryan Nations, and the White American Resistance movement, all of which are also considered to be antisemitic. The Proud Boys, despite claiming non-association with white supremacy, have been described in academic contexts as being such. Many white-supremacist groups are based on the concept of preserving genetic purity, and do not focus solely on discrimination based on skin color. The KKK's reasons for supporting racial segregation are not primarily based on religious ideals, but some Klan groups are openly Protestant. The 1915 silent drama film The Birth of a Nation followed the rising racial, economic, political, and geographic tensions leading up to the Emancipation Proclamation and the Southern Reconstruction era that was the genesis of the Ku Klux Klan.

Nazi Germany promulgated white supremacy based on the belief that the Aryan race, or the Germans, were the master race. It was combined with a eugenics programme that aimed for racial hygiene through compulsory sterilization of sick individuals and extermination of Untermenschen ("subhumans"): Slavs, Jews and Romani, which eventually culminated in the Holocaust.

Christian Identity is another movement closely tied to white supremacy. Some white supremacists identify themselves as Odinists, although many Odinists reject white supremacy. Some white-supremacist groups, such as the South African Boeremag, conflate elements of Christianity and Odinism. Creativity is atheistic and it denounces Christianity and other theistic religions. Aside from this, its ideology is similar to that of many Christian Identity groups because it believes in the antisemitic conspiracy theory that there is a "Jewish conspiracy" in control of governments, the banking industry and the media. Matthew F. Hale, founder of the World Church of the Creator, has published articles stating that all races other than white are "mud races", which is what the group's religion teaches.

The white-supremacist ideology has become associated with a racist faction of the skinhead subculture, despite the fact that when the skinhead culture first developed in the United Kingdom in the late 1960s, it was heavily influenced by black fashions and music, especially Jamaican reggae and ska, and African American soul music.

White-supremacist recruitment activities are primarily conducted at a grassroots level as well as on the Internet. Widespread access to the Internet has led to a dramatic increase in white-supremacist websites. The Internet provides a venue for open expression of white-supremacist ideas at little social cost because people who post the information are able to remain anonymous.

=== White separatism ===
White separatism is a political and social movement that seeks the separation of white people from people of other races and ethnicities. This may include the establishment of a white ethnostate by removing non-whites from existing communities or by forming new communities elsewhere.

Most modern researchers do not view white separatism as distinct from white-supremacist beliefs. The Anti-Defamation League defines white separatism as "a form of white supremacy"; the Southern Poverty Law Center defines both white nationalism and white separatism as "ideologies based on white supremacy." Facebook has banned content that is openly white nationalist or white separatist because "white nationalism and white separatism cannot be meaningfully separated from white supremacy and organized hate groups".

Use of the term to self-identify has been criticized as a dishonest rhetorical ploy. The Anti-Defamation League argues that white supremacists use the phrase because they believe it has fewer negative connotations than the term white supremacist.

Dobratz and Shanks-Meile reported that adherents usually reject marriage "outside the white race". They argued for the existence of "a distinction between the white supremacist's desire to dominate (as in apartheid, slavery, or segregation) and complete separation by race". They argued that this is a matter of pragmatism, because, while many white supremacists are also white separatists, contemporary white separatists reject the view that returning to a system of segregation is possible or desirable in the United States.

== Academic use of the term ==
The term white supremacy is used in some academic studies of racial power to denote a system of structural or societal racism which privileges white people over others, regardless of the presence or the absence of racial hatred. According to this definition, white racial advantages occur at both a collective and an individual level (ceteris paribus, i. e., when individuals are compared that do not differ relevantly except in ethnicity). Legal scholar Frances Lee Ansley explains this definition as follows:

By "white supremacy" I do not mean to allude only to the self-conscious racism of white supremacist hate groups. I refer instead to a political, economic and cultural system in which whites overwhelmingly control power and material resources, conscious and unconscious ideas of white superiority and entitlement are widespread, and relations of white dominance and non-white subordination are daily reenacted across a broad array of institutions and social settings.

This and similar definitions have been adopted or proposed by Charles W. Mills, bell hooks, David Gillborn, Jessie Daniels, and Neely Fuller Jr, and they are widely used in critical race theory and intersectional feminism. Some anti-racist educators, such as Betita Martinez and the Challenging White Supremacy workshop, also use the term in this way. The term expresses historic continuities between a pre–civil rights movement era of open white supremacy and the current racial power structure of the United States. It also expresses the visceral impact of structural racism through "provocative and brutal" language that characterizes racism as "nefarious, global, systemic, and constant". Academic users of the term sometimes prefer it to racism because it allows for a distinction to be drawn between racist feelings and white racial advantage or privilege. John McWhorter, a specialist in language and race relations, explains the gradual replacement of "racism" by "white supremacy" by the fact that "potent terms need refreshment, especially when heavily used", drawing a parallel with the replacement of "chauvinist" by "sexist".

Other intellectuals have criticized the term's recent rise in popularity among leftist activists as counterproductive. John McWhorter has described the use of "white supremacy" as straying from its commonly accepted meaning to encompass less extreme issues, thereby cheapening the term and potentially derailing productive discussion. Political columnist Kevin Drum attributes the term's growing popularity to frequent use by Ta-Nehisi Coates, describing it as a "terrible fad" that fails to convey nuance. He claims that the term should be reserved for those who are trying to promote the idea that whites are inherently superior to blacks and not used to characterize less blatantly racist beliefs or actions. The academic use of the term to refer to systemic racism has been criticized by Conor Friedersdorf for the confusion that it creates for the general public, inasmuch as it differs from the more common dictionary definition; he argues that it is likely to alienate those that it hopes to convince.

== See also ==
- Bibliography of the history of the Ku Klux Klan
- Bibliography of the history of lynching
- Afrophobia – Fear or hatred of African people
- Antisemitism – Hostility, prejudice, or discrimination against Jews
- Basking in reflected glory – Term in cognitive studies
- Black supremacy – Belief in superiority of black people
- Boreal (politics and culture) – Form of exoticism imposed on the North
- Christian Identity – White supremacist interpretation of Christianity
- Creativity (religion) – White supremacist new religious movement
- Eurocentrism
- Frances Cress Welsing – American psychiatrist (1935–2016)
- Heroes of the Fiery Cross – 1928 nonfiction book by white supremacist Alma Bridwell White
- Kinism – Segregationist religious movement
- Me and White Supremacy – 2020 book by Layla Saad
- Race and intelligence – Discussions and claims of differences in intelligence along racial lines
- Racism against Black Americans
- "The White Man's Burden – Poem by the English poet Rudyard Kipling"
- Western Supremacy (book) – Book article
- White nationalist organizations
- White power skinheads – White supremacist skinhead subculture
- White power symbol (disambiguation)
- White pride – Racist expression
- White nationalism – Ideology that seeks to develop a white national identity
- Racism on the Internet – Electronically distributed racial harassment or racist information
- Anti-Black racism – Discrimination against Black people and culture
- Racism against African Americans
- Jewish supremacy – Belief in the superiority of Jewish people
