= Bruno Mankowski =

American sculptor (1902–1990)

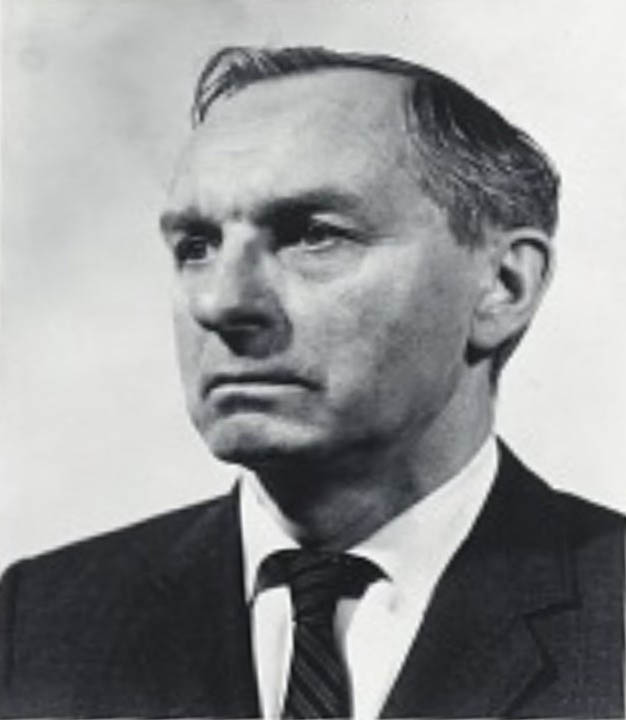
- Born: October 30, 1902; Berlin, Germany
- Died: July 31, 1990 (aged 87); DeBary, Florida, U.S.
- Education: Municipal & State Art Schools, Berlin; Beaux Arts Institute of Design, New York City
- Known for: Sculpture; Medalist
- Notable work: Genius of America pediment, U.S. Capitol; Minerva Medal
- Movement: Art Deco

Bruno Mankowski (October 30, 1902 - July 31, 1990) was a German-born American sculptor, carver, ceramicist and medalist.

Executing the designs of other sculptors, he carved architectural ornament for the United States Capitol, the United States Supreme Court Building, and the Robert F. Kennedy Department of Justice Building, in Washington, D.C. He carved Art Deco ornament for Rockefeller Center, and Neo-Gothic ornament for Riverside Church, both in New York City.

Mankowski was also a high-regarded medalist, receiving numerous commissions and awards.

== Life and career ==
He was born in Berlin to Tadeusz Mankowski and Emily Kaselow. His father was an architectural sculptor, who gave him early art instruction, and under whom he later apprenticed. He studied under Joseph Thorak at the Municipal and State Art Schools in Berlin. Mankowski emigrated to the United States in 1928, and studied further at the Beaux Arts Institute of Design in New York City. He became a naturalized American citizen in 1933.

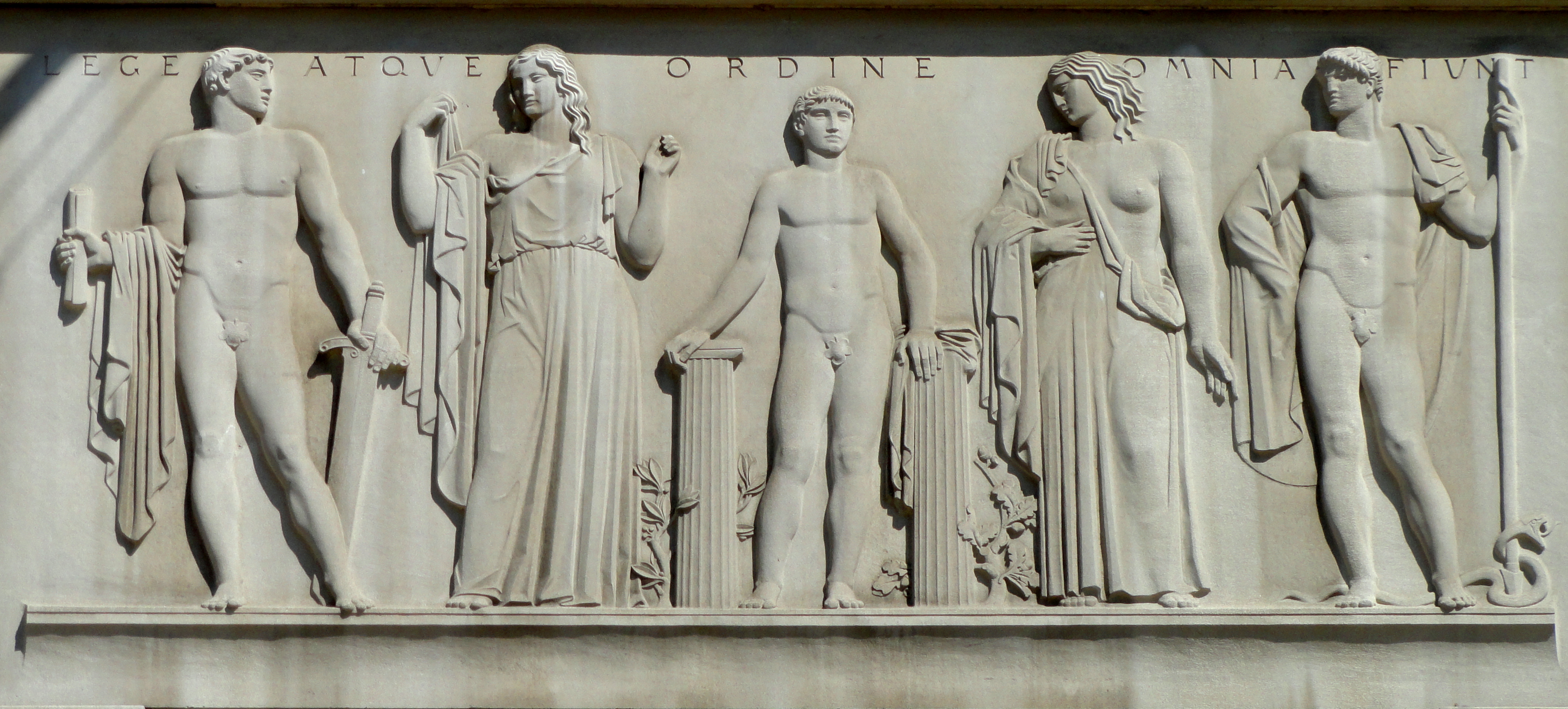
Lege Atque Ordine Omnia Fiunt architrave (1935), Paul Jennewein, sculptor

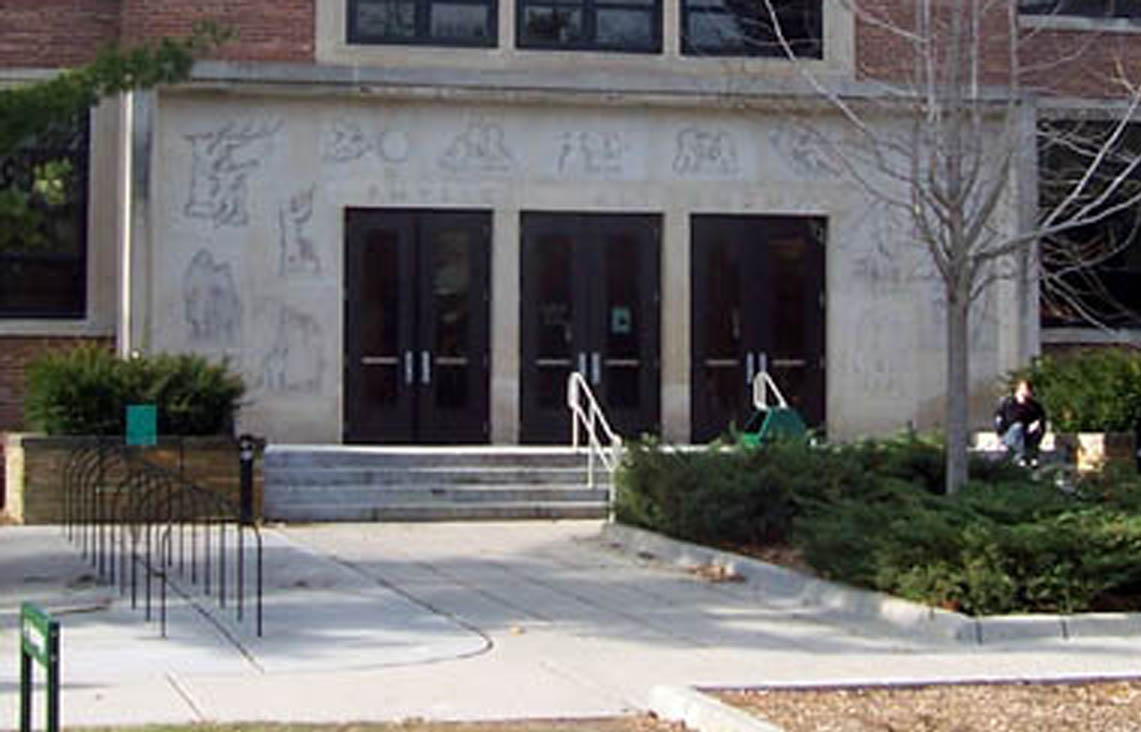
Physics - Mathematics Building (1947-1949), Michigan State University, East Lansing, (now Psychology Building)

Mankowski worked as a carver for John Donnelly & Company in the 1930s, a firm that supplied architectural sculpture for a number of Washington, D.C. federal buildings. He did work on the U. S. Supreme Court Building, although no specific project has been connected to him. Alongside carvers William Kapp, Roger Morigi and Otto Thieleman, Mankowski executed the work of sculptor Paul Jennewein for what is now the Robert F. Kennedy Department of Justice Building. This included The Four Elements—Earth, Air, Water, Fire (limestone, 1933–1936), a set of larger-than-life allegorical figures for the fifth floor lobby. The four men also carved Jennewein's Lege Atque Ordine Omnia Fiunt architrave (limestone, 1935), over the building's entrance.

In 1937, Germany committed to building a pavilion at the 1939 New York World's Fair. Fiorello LaGuardia, mayor of New York City, opposed Germany's participation in the exposition, and publicly proposed that the German Pavilion should be a "House of Horrors" of Nazi atrocities. Hitler, who seems to have planned a state visit to tour the fair, was insulted, and likely cancelled Germany's participation himself. In reaction, LaGuardia endorsed the idea of a Freedom Pavilion, that would exhibit works by German artists and exiles opposed to the Nazi Regime. The fair's Hall of Nations featured twenty identical pavilions in attached rows, ten on each side of the Court of Peace, culminating, at the head of the court, with the United States (Federal) Building. Each pavilion featured a colossal statue on its façade and a flagpole for the country's national flag. Mankowski created the colossal statue Shepherd—a "semi-nude male figure carrying sheep on shoulders; two sheep at feet"—for what may have been the Freedom Pavilion. Grover Whalen, president of the New York World's Fair Corporation, had worked hard to secure Germany's participation, and resented LaGuardia's interference. "In the end, fair officials prevented the [Freedom] pavilion from ever opening." Mankowski's statue stood on an empty building.

For the Works Progress Administration art program, Mankowski created The Farmer's Letter (1939), a plaster relief panel for the post office in Chesterfield, South Carolina. He served in the U.S. Army during World War II, 1942-1945.

After the war, Michigan State University built a new Physics - Mathematics Building (1947-1949). A Modernist, functional building, its austerity was relieved by a bit of whimsy. Professor Thomas H. Osgood, Chair of the Physics Department, selected a number of illustrations from the History of Science, and these were incised into the limestone panels surrounding the building's entrance. Among the vignettes: Galileo and his solar system, Isaac Newton and his experiments with gravity, Benjamin Franklin and his kite, Marconi and his wireless telegraph, and Albert Einstein and the atom. Sculptor Carl L. Schmitz turned the illustrations into plaster models, and Mankowski carved them into the limestone.

Mankowski exhibited Pieta at the 14th Ceramic National Exhibition (1949), hosted by the Carnegie Museum of Art, Pittsburgh. This highly usual piece was a larger-than-life double head-and-bust, and depicted the Madonna embracing the dead Christ. (Note: "Ceramic fanciers will thrill to the varying designs, colors, and textures of the prize-winning sculptures in the exhibit. There is the monumental Pieta, heads of the Madonna and Christ in dark rough texture terra cotta, by Bruno Mankowski.") It was awarded the 1949 United Clay Mines Prize. The ceramic exhibition traveled to Dallas and Los Angeles.

Mankowski won the 1949 design competition (and $1,500 prize) to create the medal commemorating the upcoming 50th anniversary of the Medallic Art Company. Its obverse featured an Art Deco relief bust of Minerva, Goddess of the Fine Arts, with a pantograph in the foreground, the device used to trace a relief for reduction. Its reverse featured the palm of a hand holding the same medal shown on the obverse. The work alluded to both the artistic inspiration and the mechanical process necessary to create a medal. Examples of the "Minerva Medal" are in the collections of the Metropolitan Museum of Art, the National Gallery of Art, and other museums.

=== U.S. Capitol ===
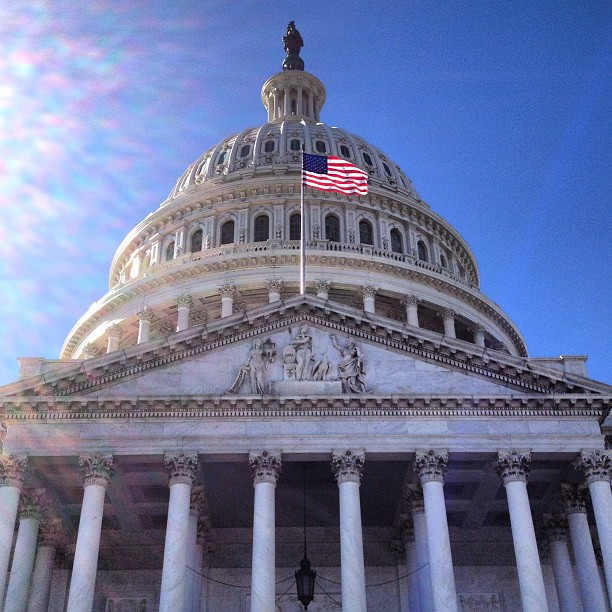
The Genius of America pediment (1959-1960), East Portico, U.S. Capitol, carved by Mankowski (after Luigi Persico's 1825-1828 original)

As part of the 1949-1950 restoration of the U.S. Capitol, prominent American sculptors were commissioned to create twenty-three relief busts of historic lawmakers for the House Chamber. Mankowski carved nine of the relief busts in marble, modeled by sculptors Gaetano Cecere, Jean de Marco, and Thomas Hudson Jones. The twenty-three relief busts were installed over the doors to the House Chamber.

Lee Lawrie modeled three relief panels for the Senate Chamber, including Courage, depicting a man battling with a serpent. (Note: Lawrie wrote: "Courage symbolizes our nation, which unflinchingly battles Evil and vanquishes it. I used the biblical symbol for Evil, the serpent.") Mankowski carved Courage in marble, 1950, and it was installed over the West Doorway of the Senate Chamber.

Under the supervision of Paul Manship, Mankowski created a replica of the Genius of America pediment for the East Portico of the U.S. Capitol. Luigi Persico had designed and carved the original sculpture group in sandstone, 1825-1828. Carl L. Schmitz recreated the 130-year-old figures in plaster, restoring lost detail, including their eroded faces. These became the models from which Mankowski carved the marble replicas, 1959-1960.

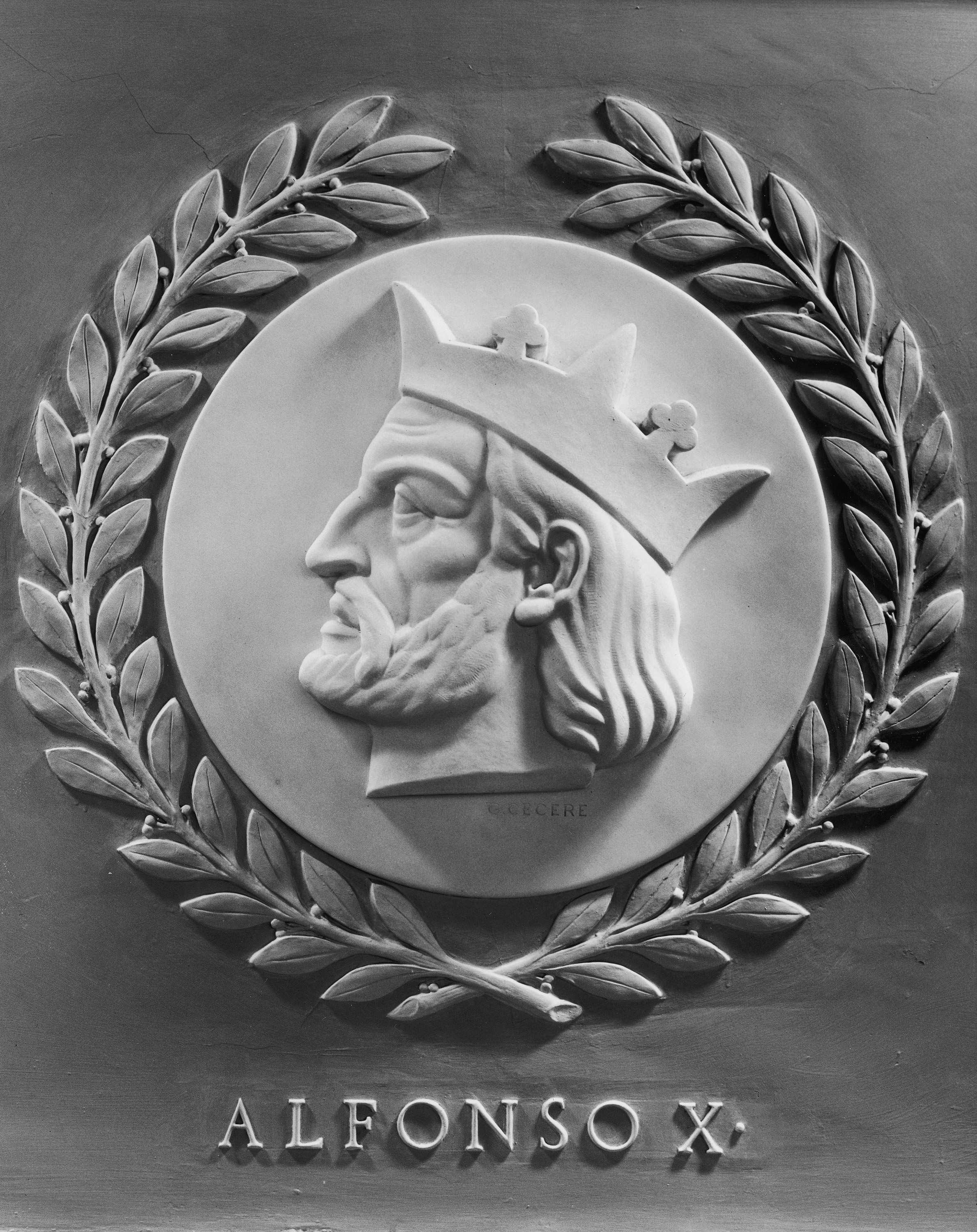
Alphonso X "The Wise" (1950) by Gaetano Cecere, House Chamber

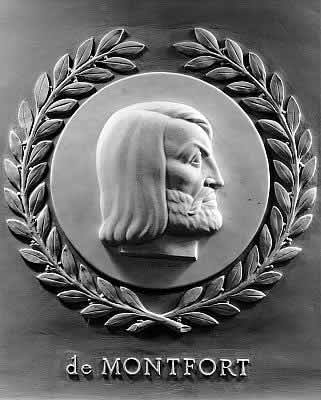
Simon de Montfort (1950) by Gaetano Cecere, House Chamber

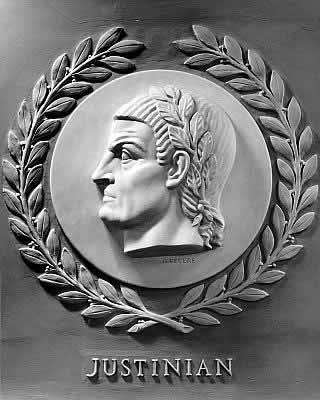
Justinian (1950) by Gaetano Cecere, House Chamber

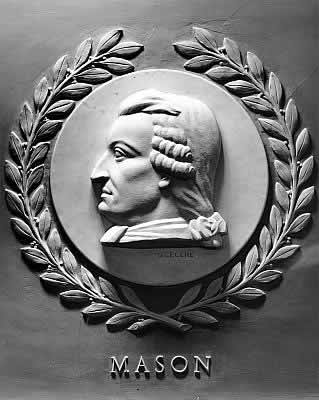
George Mason (1950) by Gaetano Cecere, House Chamber

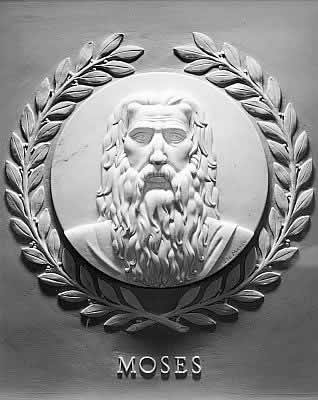
Moses (1950) by Jean de Marco, House Chamber

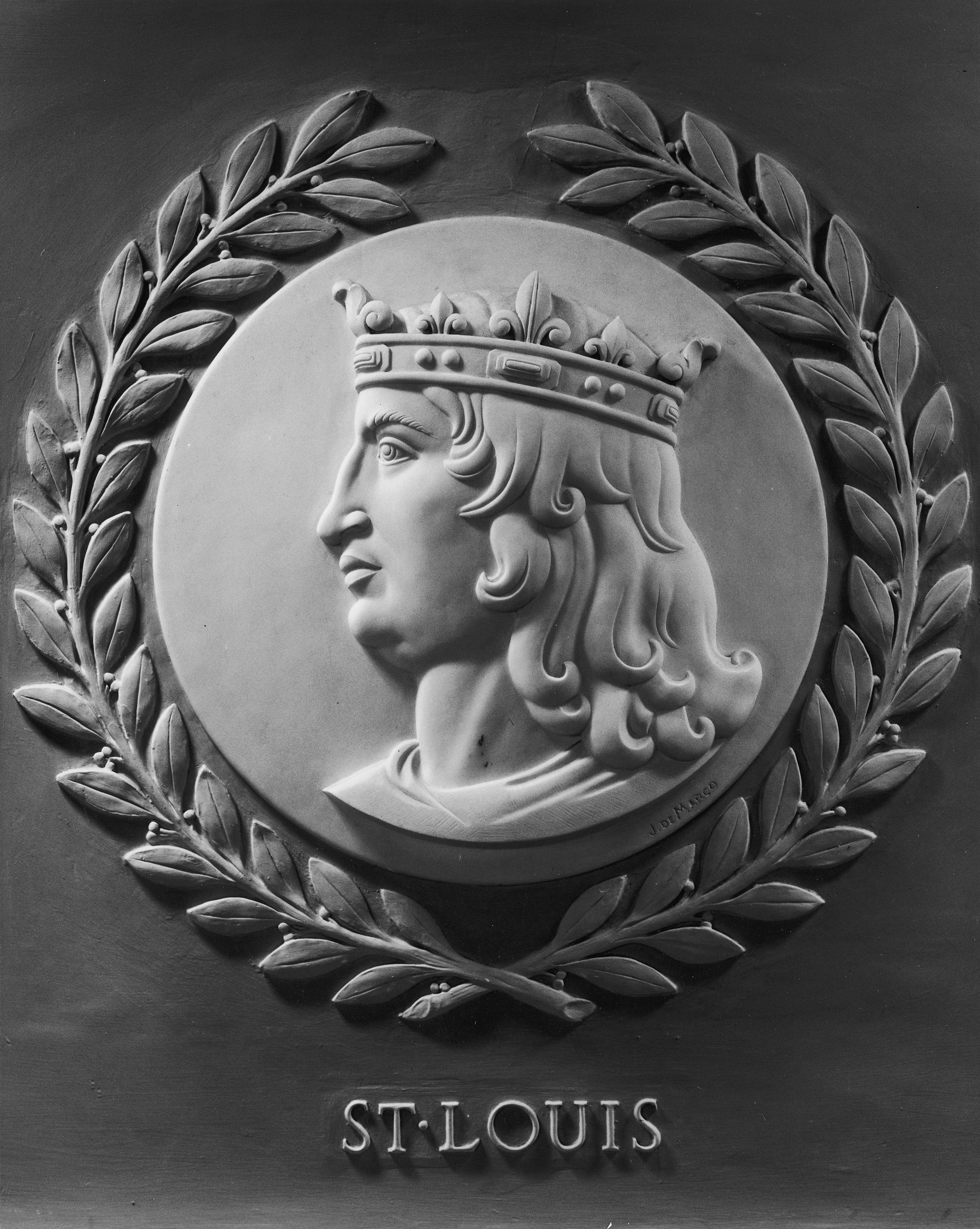
St. Louis (1950) by Jean de Marco, House Chamber

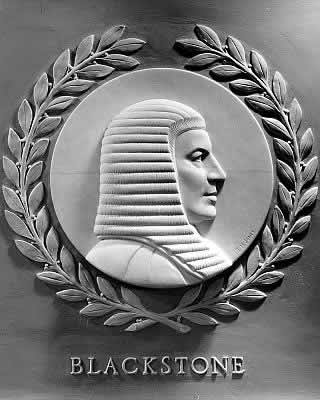
Sir William Blackstone (1950) by Thomas Hudson Jones, House Chamber

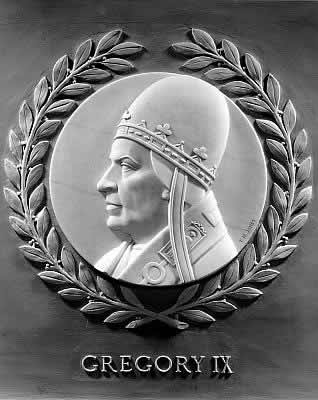
Gregory IX (1950) by Thomas Hudson Jones, House Chamber

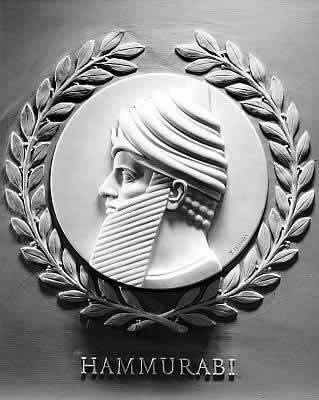
Hammurabi (1950) by Thomas Hudson Jones, House Chamber

=== Other works ===
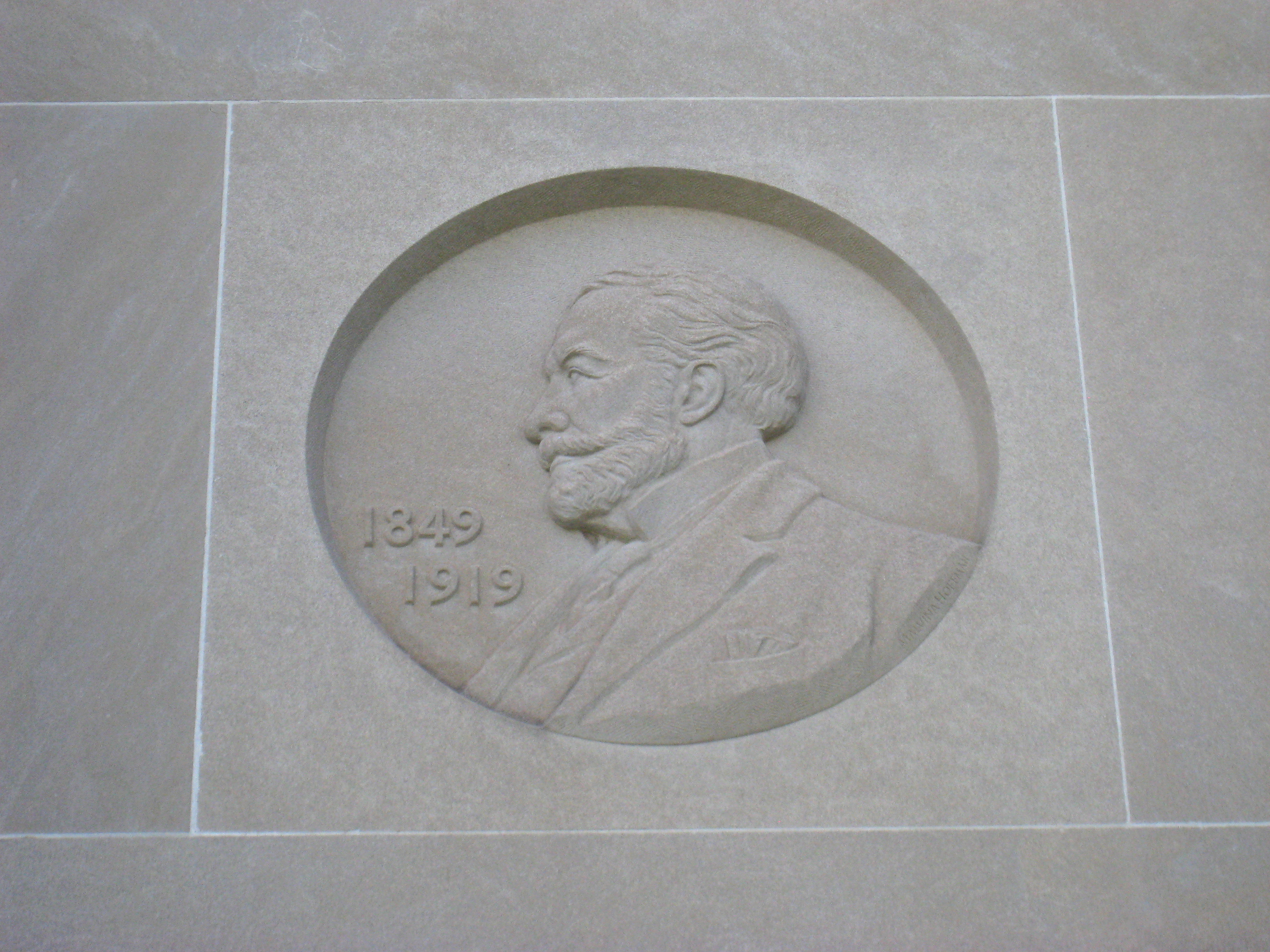
Portrait of Henry Clay Frick (1964 or 1965) by Malvina Hoffman, Frick Fine Arts Building, University of Pittsburgh

In 1950, American Export Lines commissioned twin ocean liners from Bethlehem Steel's Fore River Shipyard in Quincy, Massachusetts. Completed in 1951, they were christened SS Constitution and SS Independence, in honor of historic warships that had been built in Massachusetts. Mankowski was commissioned to recreate the warships' figureheads for the liners. The original figurehead of USS Constitution (1897) had been a figure of Hercules, designed and carved by John & Simeon Skillin of Boston. The original figurehead of USS Independence had a been a figure of a Native American chief, possibly Massasoit. Mankowski made life size models of his replica figureheads, but the plan for enlarging them and mounting them on the bows of the liners was abandoned. Instead, each model was displayed inside its liner as a work of art. (Note: "A striking feature of the Constitution's Main Foyer is a life-size recreation of the Hercules figurehead of the original Constitution, "Old Ironsides," done by the sculptor Bruno Mankowski in a non-combustible stone-like material that exactly simulates the appearance of the original wooden." "The Indian who greets passengers in the foyer was reproduced by sculptor Bruno Mankowski from drawings of the original figurehead intended for the Navy's U.S.S. Independence.")

Mankowski created numerous designs for the Steuben Glass Company, notably the etched crystal Buffalo Bowl (1954).

Paul Jennewein and Mankowski reunited for a project at the National Library of Medicine, in Bethesda, Maryland. In 1961, Jennewein was commissioned to create a group portrait of the library's late founders: Dr. John Shaw Billings, Dr. Robert Fletcher and Dr. Fielding Garrison. His solution was essentially a larger-than-life drawing of the trio, its lines inscribed into the gray marble of library's lobby, then gold leafed. "The portrait busts of Billings, Fletcher, and Garrison, designed by Mr. C. Paul Jennewein, have been chiseled into the marble of the north wall of the lobby by Mr. Bruno Mankowski, an expert carver and an artist in his own right."

Malvina Hoffman modeled, and Mankowski carved in limestone, a roundel relief bust of Henry Clay Frick (1964 or 1965), for the façade of the Frick Fine Arts Building at the University of Pittsburgh. (Note: Hoffman wrote: "I prepared a plaster original, and the actual carving was done by Bruno Mankowski, since union regulations prevent sculptors from doing their own work when it is part of a building.")

=== Exhibitions, honors and awards ===
Mankowski exhibited at the National Academy of Design's annual exhibitions, 1940-1943, 1947-1950, 1956-1963. He exhibited semi-regularly at the Pennsylvania Academy of the Fine Arts's annual exhibitions, from 1934 to 1954. He exhibited at the Artists for Victory Exhibition, hosted by the Metropolitan Museum of Art, in December 1942.

Mankowski was elected to the National Sculpture Society in 1941, and elected a fellow in year. NSS awarded him its 1952 Louis Bennett Prize (for Minerva Medal), and its 1972 Gold Medal. Mankowski was elected a member of the American Numismatic Society in year, and was elected a fellow in year. ANS awarded him its 1960 J. Sanford Saltus Medal for lifetime achievement in medallic art, and its 1980 Numismatic Art Award. He was elected to the American Academy of Arts and Letters in 1950. (Note: Citation: "To BRUNO MANKOWSKI, born in Germany, in recognition of a fine sculptor in stone and marble. His figure compositions are distinguished by robust modeling and sensitive interpretation of the forms of nature.") Mankowski was elected an associate member of the National Academy of Design in 1956, and elected an academician in 1968. The Allied Artists of America awarded him its 1960 Lindsay Morris Memorial Prize, and its 1964 Daniel Chester French Award.

=== Personal ===
Mankowski was living in Toronto, Canada in the 1970s. Art historian George Gurney interviewed him in preparation for the 1979 exhibition "Sculpture and the Federal Triangle," at the National Museum of American Art.

Mankowski retired to DeBary, Florida in 1980. He died there on July 31, 1990. His only survivor was a nephew.

Mankowski's papers are at the Archives of American Art.

== Selected works ==
=== Sculptures ===
- Seated Female Figure (medium, c.1934), height: 36 in (91 cm). Exhibited at Pennsylvania Academy of the Fine Arts, 1934.
- Relief: The Farmer's Letter (plaster, 1939), height: 30 in (76 cm), width: height: 84 in (210 cm), U.S. Post Office, Chesterfield, South Carolina, WPA relief panel
- Shepherd (staff?, 1939), Hall of Nations, 1939 New York World's Fair
- Head of American Working Girl (medium, c.1942). Exhibited at Artists for Victory Exhibition, 1942. Exhibited at Pennsylvania Academy of the Fine Arts, 1947.
- Relief: War Memorial Plaque (bronze, 1948), Macombs Junior High School, New York City
- The Sisters (limestone, 1949), height: 16 in (41 cm). Exhibited at Pennsylvania Academy of the Fine Arts, 1949.
- Pieta (terra cotta, 1949). Winner of the United Clay Mines Prize, 14th Ceramic National Exhibition (1949), Carnegie Museum of Art
- Hercules (cast stone?, 1950-1951), replica figurehead for SS Constitution
- Massasoit (cast stone?, 1950-1951), replica figurehead for SS Independence
- Relief: Lithuanian Flyers Memorial (aluminum and marble, 1957), Lithuania Square, Union Avenue & Hewes Street, Brooklyn, New York City A double portrait of Lithuanian-American pilots Steponas Darius and Stasys Girėnas, who attempted a 1933 trans-Atlantic flight from Brooklyn to Lithuania, but whose plane mysteriously went down over Germany.
- Intimate Conversation (terra cotta, 1958), height: 29 in (74 cm). Winner of the Ceramic Sculpture Award, Twentieth Ceramic International Exhibition (1959), Syracuse Museum.
- Young Woman Standing (terra cotta, 1959)
- Kneeling Nude (Indiana limestone, 1970), height: 36 in (91 cm), Tampa Museum of Art, Tampa, Florida
- Duckbill Platypus (marble, 1988), Brookgreen Gardens, Murrells Inlet, South Carolina
- Girl with Book (stone, year), height: 22.75 in (57.8 cm), National Academy of Design Museum, New York City
- Head of a Man - Self-portrait (plaster, year)

=== Medals ===
- New York World's Fair Medal (bronze, 1939), Equitable Life Assurance Company
- 50th Anniversary Medal of Medallic Art Company a.k.a. Minerva Medal (bronze, 1949). Winner of the National Sculpture Society's 1952 Louis Bennett Prize. Examples at Metropolitan Museum of Art, National Gallery of Art, and other museums.
- Diamond Jubilee of Electric Light Medal (bronze, 1954)
- Franklin Delano Roosevelt Medal (bronze, 1968)
- American Folklore Medal (bronze, 1969), National Gallery of Art (ex collection: Corcoran Gallery of Art) Society of Medalists - 79th Issue: features an image of Paul Bunyan on the obverse and Johnny Appleseed on the reverse.
- George Washington Carver Medal (bronze, 1969), American Negro Commemorative Society
- Science and Technical Award Medal (bronze, 1972). The obverse is a high relief after Leonardo da Vinci's Vitruvian Man.
- George Gershwin Medal (bronze, 1972)
- Asa Gray Medal (bronze, 1972), Hall of Fame for Great Americans, New York University
- Henry Aaron Medal (bronze, 1974)
- Marqui de Lafayette Medal (bronze, 1977), American Bicentennial Commemorative Society

=== Paintings ===
- Self-Portrait (oil on canvas, 1967), National Academy of Design Museum, New York City

=== Glass ===
- Buffalo Bowl (etched crystal, 1954), Steuben Glass Company
