= The Discovery of America (sculpture) =

Sculpture by Luigi Persico

Coordinates: 38.8897°N 77.0086°W

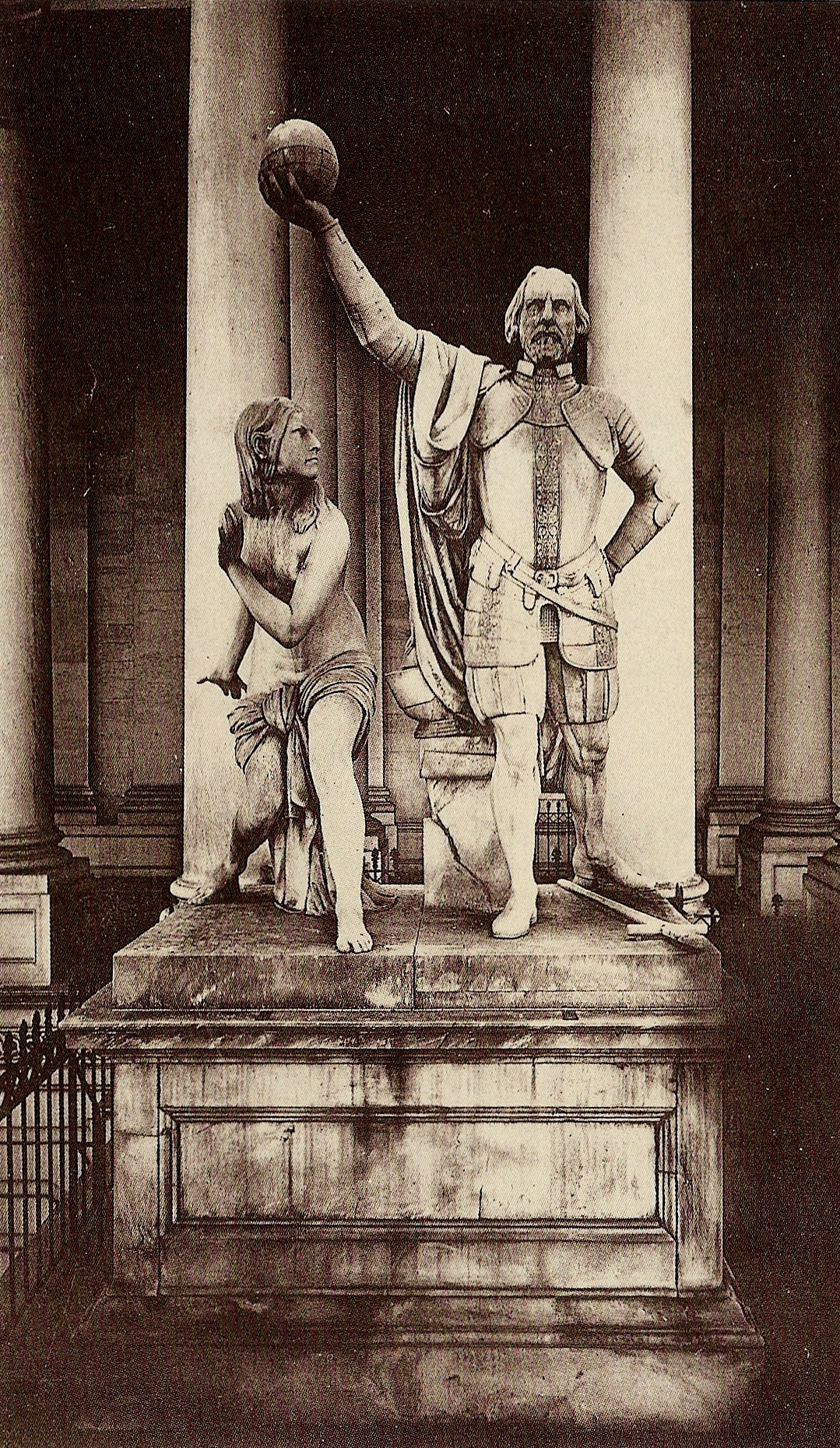
- Artist: Luigi Persico
- Year: 1844; 182 years ago
- Type: White marble
- Dimensions: 486.4 cm × 255.3 cm × 184.2 cm (191 1/2 in × 100 1/2 in × 72 1/2 in)
- Location: Formerly east façade of the United States Capitol (In storage), Washington, D.C.

The Discovery of America is a large marble sculptural group, created by Luigi Persico, which adorned the front of the east façade of the United States Capitol building from 1844 to 1958, before being put into storage.

== Background ==
The first proposal for the construction of two sculptures to flank the Capitol's main staircase was submitted by Pennsylvania senator James Buchanan in April, 1836. The Discovery of America was commissioned on April 3, 1837, when President Martin Van Buren sanctioned the engineering of Luigi Persico’s design for the sculptural group. The group was modeled in 1839, and carved between 1840 and 1843. Persico created the statue in his studio in Naples, using marble from a quarry between Pisa and Carrara, and it was transported to the U.S. upon completion. It was exhibited at the Capitol's east façade from 1844 until 1958, when it was removed.

Various Indian groups wrote letters to the Architect of the Capitol calling for The Discovery of America and its pendant, The Rescue (by Horatio Greenough), to be removed permanently. Even beyond Native Americans, statements made by many Congress members indicated their opposition to the statues. In a 1941 Congressional session, Montana representative James Francis O'Connor described the accompanying statue, "The Rescue" as "an atrocious distortion of the facts of American history and... an insult to [a] great race of people..." After years of protest, in 1958 both The Discovery of America and The Rescue were removed from the east façade in preparation for the building's extension. These two statues were placed in storage and – without public discussion – never restored to their original positions on the left and right side of the building's primary staircase.

== Description ==
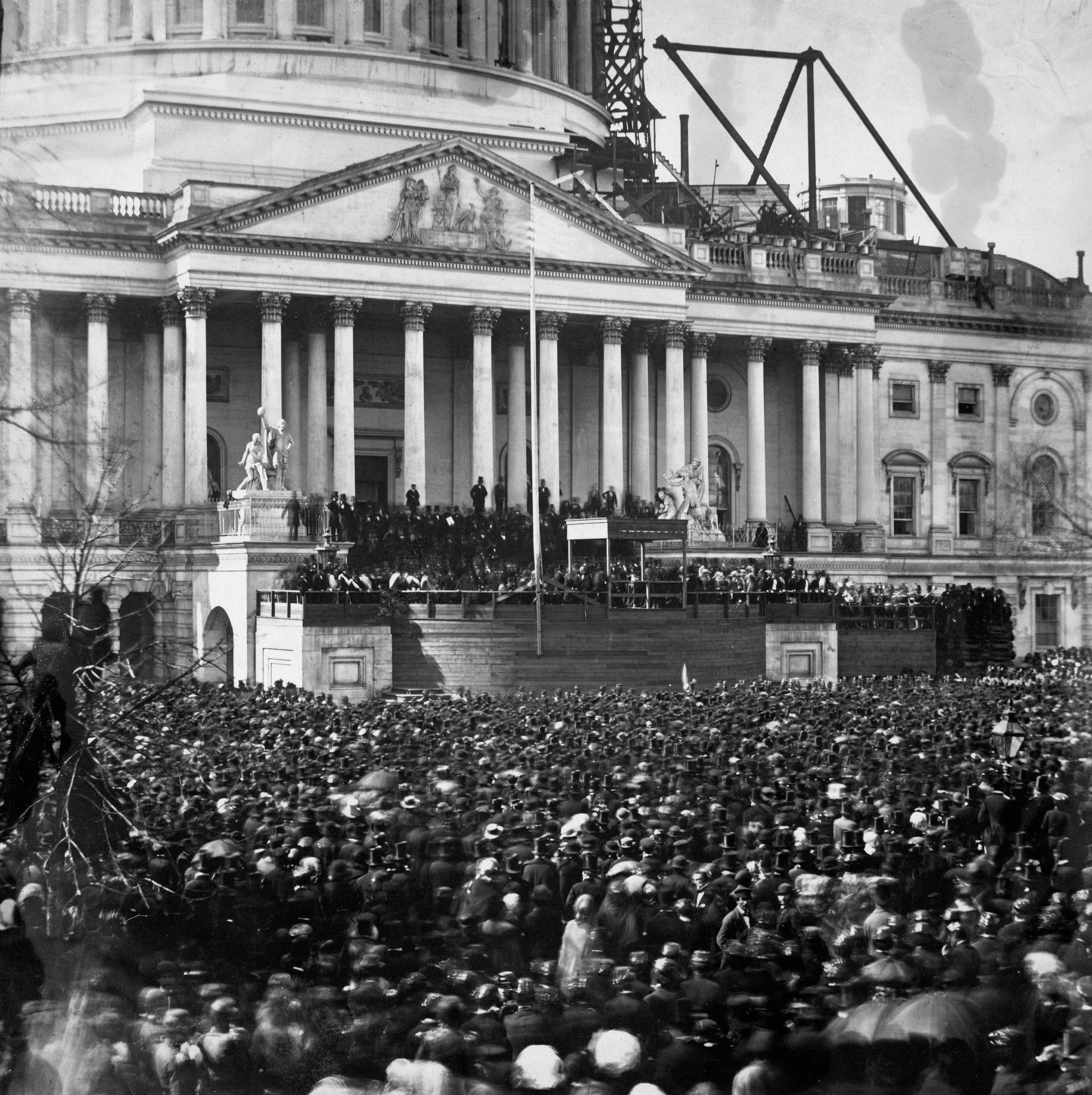
Both The Discovery (left) and The Rescue (right) are visible in this image of Abraham Lincoln's 1861 inauguration.

There is a simultaneous movement of Columbus pressing on to conquer the New World he discovered with a powerful disposition, as the female Indian stands back, intimidated in response. The relationship displayed between Columbus and the female Indian in The Discovery of America extends to "represent the meeting of the two races", as Persico captures their first interaction, highlighting the "moral and intellectual inferiority" of Indians.

The portrayal of this encounter would later become popular iconography in American art and be used to justify political expansionism. In fact, even the placement of The Discovery of America at the Capitol's main entrance staircase was interpreted as contributing to its portrayal of Western civilization's triumph under white male leadership.

Columbus stands boldly, displaying the success of white settlers in taking possession of the New World as the Indian acknowledges his superiority and draws back, wide-eyed.

This representation of Columbus is very different from the traditional portraits, rendering him as a bearded, hawk-faced and stern-eyed figure clad in traditional Conquistador armor.

Usually, Columbus is shown in flowing Renaissance robes with an astrolabe or a spyglass in hand to represent his title of "Admiral of the Ocean". Persico's Discovery of America thus introduces the understanding of Columbus in the context of the mid-1800s – the time period in which this statue was created – as a "bold adventurer ... unequalled in grace, and unapproached in majesty, by anything which native or foreign talent affords".

President James Buchanan described the statue as representing "the great discoverer when he first bounded with ecstasy upon the shore, ail his toils past, presenting a hemisphere to the astonished world, with the name America inscribed upon it. Whilst he is thus standing upon the shore, a female savage, with awe and wonder depicted in her countenance, is gazing upon him."

== Political context ==
The Discovery of America, as well as other charged artworks commissioned to adorn the Capitol building, contributed to the iconography which informed westward expansion. Many works of art created for the Capitol building were even used by congressmen to support political movements west, due to their underlying symbolism related to Manifest Destiny – specifically the inherent Anglo-American supremacy over native Indians. Columbus, fully attired, is clearly the dominant figure while the nearly-nude Indian woman gazes up at him with a combination of both awe and fear. In this way, the statue references the popular early- to mid-19th-century notion of Manifest Destiny through the allegory of Americans spreading civilization and, more specifically, Christianity to the natives whom they considered to be savages. In fact, prior to the sculpture's erection there was already an almost uniform viewpoint in the antebellum United States regarding Indian preservation, where environmental expansion was concerned. This sentiment is clearly expressed in an 1825 debate of the Committee on Indian Affairs, as member John Elliott referred to Indian–white settler relations as a "contest ... for the existence of our infant settlements, and for the attainment of that power by which a civilized and Christian people might safely occupy this promised land of civil and religious liberty".

Thus, this display of American fascination with explorations earlier in its history draws an interesting parallel with the westward expansion taking place during the time of the sculpture's erection. Furthermore, there is evidence of concrete references made to Persico's statue in arguments intended to prove America's mission inherent in Manifest Destiny ideology and in doing so, justify the annexation of Indian land. In 1845, for example, Alabama representative James E. Belser defended the decision to seize Texas, contending that "two figures which have so recently been erected on the eastern portico of this Capitol" display "an instructive lesson" regarding the manifestation of liberty and light which would continue to spread as America expanded westward. As a result of this layered symbolism and The Discovery of America's emergence in political rhetoric, the sculpture seems to act as a justification of the legislative actions of Andrew Jackson to approve the Indian Removal Act, which resulted in severe consequences for native people – most notably, the Trail of Tears.

== Fate ==
During the process to move The Discovery of America and The Rescue to storage, a crane dropped The Rescue. The statue broke into the fragments in which it now subsists. The Discovery of America is said to be in a similarly poor state of preservation. Both statues can now be found in a storage facility in Maryland, owned by the Smithsonian Institution.

== See also ==
- List of monuments and memorials to Christopher Columbus
