= Luigi Persico =

Italian painter

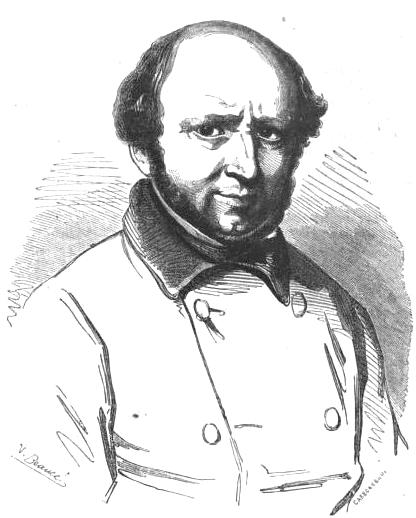
Portrait of Luigi Persico

Luigi Persico (1791 Naples – 14 May 1860 Marseille) was an Italian neoclassical painter and sculptor.

== Biography ==
Born in Naples, Luigi Persico studied at the Accademia di Belle Arti di Napoli, then headed by the French painter Jean-Baptiste Wicar. He moved to the United States of America in 1815, where he was soon joined by his brother Gennaro, an art teacher. After living some time in Baltimore, he lived between 1817 and 1824 in Lancaster, Pennsylvania, where he designed and painted portraits (including posthumous, of General Edward Hand). During this period in Pennsylvania, he also worked in Harrisburg, where he participated in sculptural decoration of the Pennsylvania State Capitol and, after 1818, in Philadelphia, where he sculpted the bust of Dr. Nathaniel Chapman. After 1824, he settled in Washington, D.C. where he became famous for his bust of the Marquis de Lafayette (1825), directed at the latter's triumphal visit to the United States.

== Participation in the setting of the Capitol (1825-1844) ==
=== The Genius of America (1825-1828) ===
This first success opened the doors of a prestigious order: the pediment of the eastern portico of the United States Capitol in Washington. On May 31, 1825, Persico, accompanied by the architect Charles Bulfinch, presented a model of the project to President John Quincy Adams. Adams appreciated the allegories of Justice and America, but demanded the replacement of the allegory of the Force, represented by a Hercules too "pagan" to his taste, to an allegory of Hope. After noting to the president that all the characters were now female, the Persico accepted the changes required by Adams and developed the figure of Hope leaning on an anchor. Adams thought that this looked too much like an anchor on the new Dutch ship design. Persico then went to Commodore Thomas Tingey to get a more authentic image. In June 1828, he told Adams, who came to admire the work being completed, "Now, if a sailor looks at this pediment, he will say that the anchor is represented accurately! ". The three figures in high relief in the sandstone, about three meters high, were completed in summer 1828. In December of that year, Persico returned to Italy after Adams spoke to his desire to continue working at the sculptural decoration of the Capitol. Through the intervention of Adams, and with the pediment well-received, Persico obtained two new sculpture commissions for the Capitol.

=== War and Peace (1829-1834) ===
The statues of Peace (in the guise of Ceres) and War (in the guise of Mars), aimed at niches flanking the entrance to the Capitol rotunda, were commissioned in 1829 by Adams, among the last acts of his presidency.

These two statues, made in Italy, were delivered in 1834, years during which Persico returned to America to sell works of Italian masters, and especially to reactivate its political networks for new orders. Having failed in this last attempt, he returned to Europe in March 1835. Convinced that there was no longer work for the U.S. government, he sadly bade farewell to his patron and friend, John Quincy Adams. However, there followed an order from President Martin Van Buren in 1837, following a proposal by Democratic Senator (and later president) James Buchanan.

=== The Discovery of America (1837-1844) ===
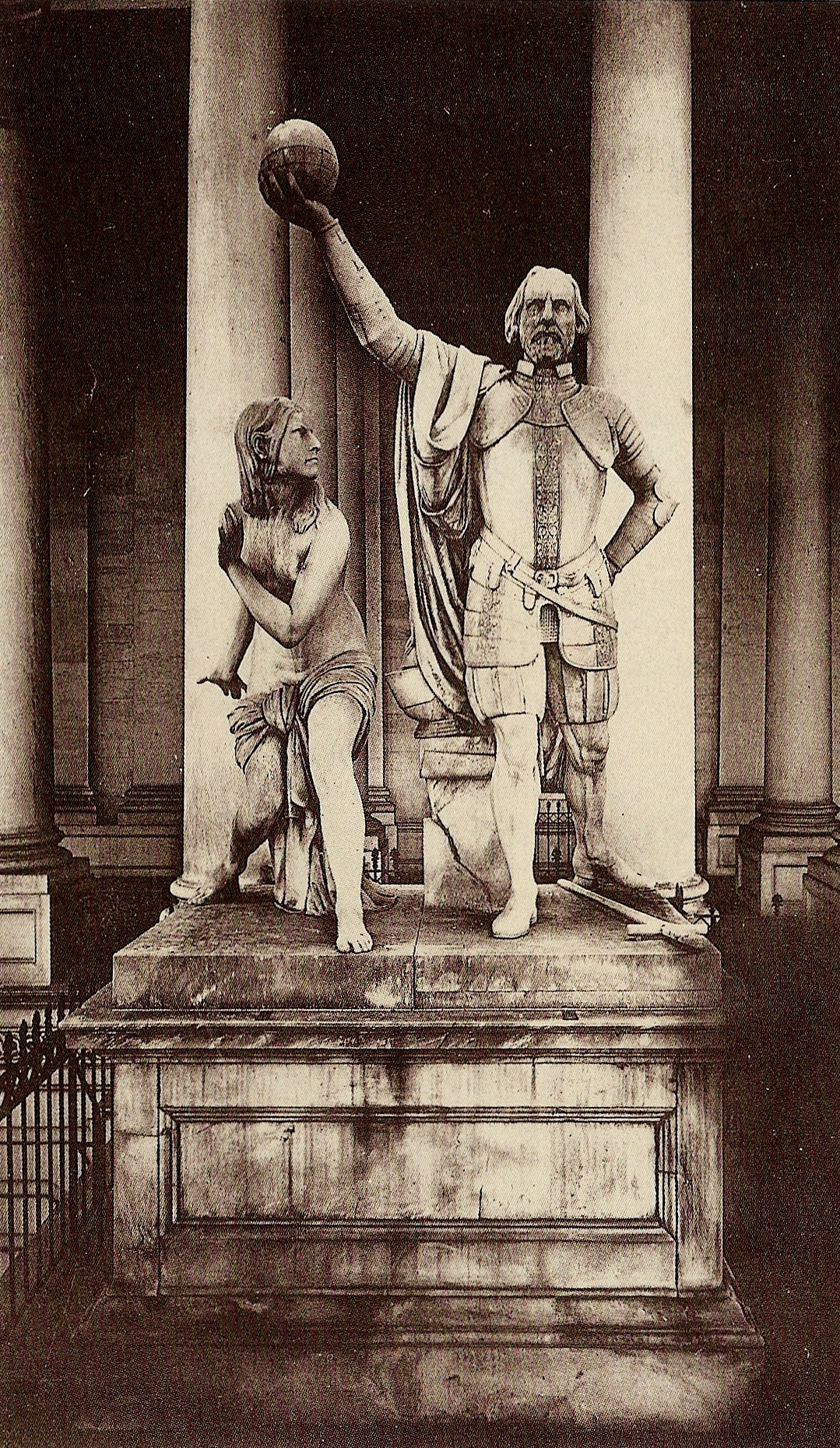
The Discovery of America

The Discovery of America, was a figure group nearly five meters high including a statue of Christopher Columbus brandishing a globe and a statue of Indian. This monumental marble group was directed by Persico in Florence, 9 from 1840, and May 17, 1844, placed to the left of the stairs of the portico. The Discovery of America received mixed reviews from critics and the press, particularly because of the nudity of the female character (criticized, for example, in the Baltimore Sun).

The following year, this group was enthusiastically described in the picturesque words of Edouard Charton:

The subject is the discovery of the New World. Columbus crowd finally guessed this land by his genius, he turned to Europe, and it shows a globe, a sign of the true shape of the earth, that ignorance and envy were obstinate to be considered a fanciful hypothesis. While he thus abandons entirely the thoughts which fill his soul with a serious enthusiasm, an Indian woman looks at him with admiration and with awe at the same time: in his eyes, Columbus is a supernatural apparition, a demigod; one feels she does not know whether to flee or prostrate. The difference in civilization between the two races is expressed by the softness and the nakedness of this woman, opposed to the male energy and the noble attitude of the European hero. Newspapers of the United States have all made great praise of this composition, it would be difficult to judge on a simple sketch. We unanimously applaud the figure of Columbus in the expression of intellectual superiority and moral dignity are found in the Indian girl all the distinctive characteristics of the breed it represents.

These comments contrast with the severe criticism less than half a century later by Nestor Ponce de Leon, the iconographer of Columbus:

The face of Columbus presents absolutely no resemblance to the descriptions we have of him. As for the attitude of the admiral, with his globe in hand, it strikes me as ridiculous Supreme: it looks like a warrior of XVIIth century playing baseball with a ball disproportionate. His attitude also lacks natural, and I can not find words to express my surprise at the posture of little artistic figure of the young Indian. This group has cost $24,000 and took five years of work. I think it does not deserve to be reproduced here.

Between 1958 and 1962, during the expansion and restoration of the Capitol, The Discovery of America and its counterpart, The Rescue, by Horatio Greenough, were removed permanently after controversy because of their negative representation of Native Americans. The high relief of the pediment, called The Genius of America, and the statues of the niches, highly degraded, were removed and replaced by marble replicas, by Bruno Mankowski, George Gianetti, and Paul Manship.

== Other achievements in America and Italy ==
In 1825, the United States Mint commissioned a model of a coin, representing the head of Liberty, whose engraving was entrusted to William Kneass. Between 1829 and 1850, Persico sculpted several monuments and many busts, including those of:

- Charles F. Mercer and Thomas Law, made in 1829;
- John Quincy Adams, modeled in March 1829, which included a performance Persico marble in 1835;
- Andrew Jackson, made in 1834 and Persico offered by the President January 8, 1835;
- Jared Sparks, made in 1834;
- William Ellery Channing, made in 1835;
- Nicholas Biddle, and John Bannister Gibson, made in 1837;
- Viscount Palmerston, made in 1846.

On January 31, 1845, he visited John Quincy Adams, asking him to intervene on behalf of his plans for a colossal equestrian statue of Washington, which was never executed.

In 1855, he created a statue of Francis I of the Two Sicilies at the Foro Borbonico of Palermo , and in 1858, the colossal statue of Religion placed at the top of the stairs of the church of Saint Francis of Gaeta. He is also the sculptor of the tomb of Neapolitan surgeon Leonardo Santoro.

While in Marseille, Persico died on May 14, 1860.
