= Surrender of Lord Cornwallis =

1820 painting by John Trumbull

The Surrender of Lord Cornwallis
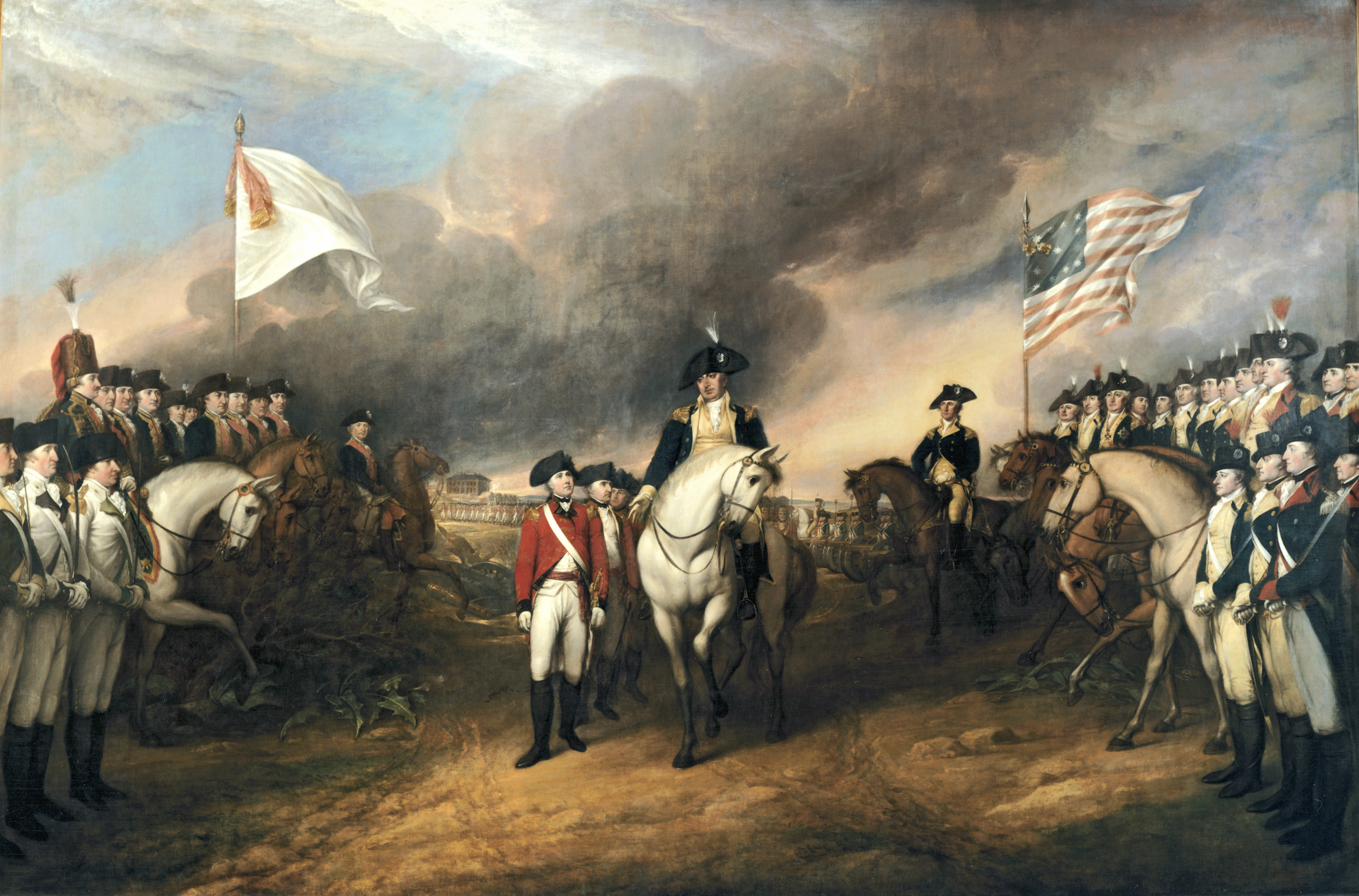
- Artist: John Trumbull
- Year: 1819–1820
- Type: Oil painting
- Dimensions: 3.7 m × 5.5 m (12 ft × 18 ft)
- Location: United States Capitol rotunda, Washington, D.C., U.S.
- Owner: United States

Surrender of Lord Cornwallis is an oil-on-canvas painting by John Trumbull. Completed in 1820, the painting now hangs in the rotunda of the United States Capitol in Washington, D.C.

The painting depicts the surrender of the British army under Lieutenant-general Lord Cornwallis at Yorktown, Virginia on October 19, 1781, which ended the siege of Yorktown. The Franco-American victory at the siege guaranteed American independence. Included in the depiction are several prominent American, French and British officers that took part in the siege.

In the center of the painting, British General Charles O'Hara, at the head of a line of British officers and soldiers, hands over his sword to American General Benjamin Lincoln as part of the surrender ceremony. French troops stand to the left of the British, while American troops, including General George Washington stand on the right.

== Commission ==
Artist John Trumbull (1756–1843) spent the early part of the American Revolutionary War as a soldier, serving as an aide to both George Washington and Horatio Gates. After resigning from the army in 1777, he pursued a career as an artist. In 1785 he began sketching out ideas for a series of large-scale paintings to commemorate the major events of the American Revolution. After spending a time in England, he returned to New York City in 1789, where he sketched a number of dignitaries whose portraits he intended to use in these paintings. In 1791 he traveled to Yorktown, Virginia, where he sketched the landscape of the surrender site.

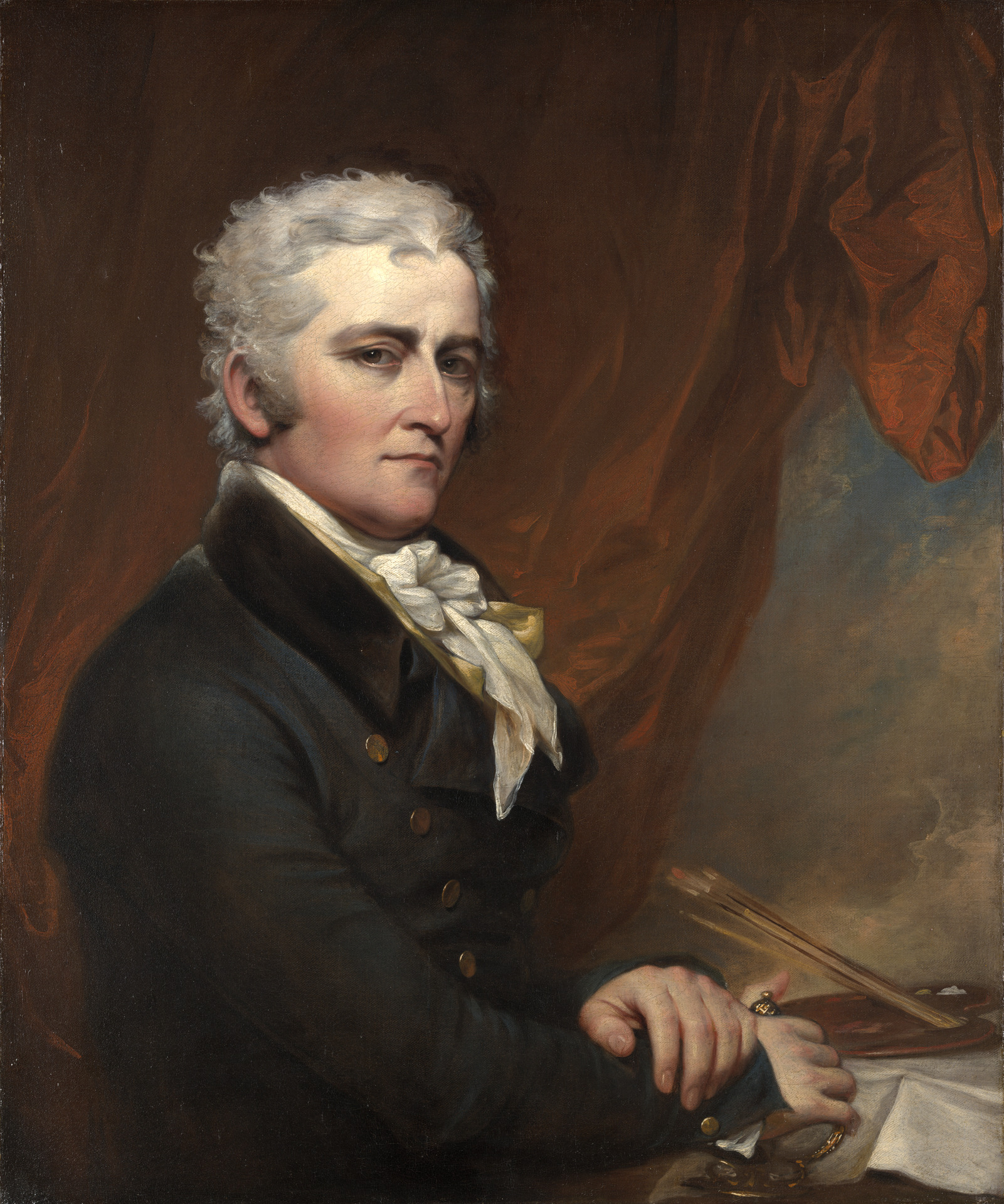
Self-portrait of Trumbull

Upon his return from Britain after the end of the War of 1812, he promoted this idea to the United States Congress. On the strength of his application and the successful exhibition of The Death of General Warren at the Battle of Bunker's Hill, June 17, 1775 and The Death of General Montgomery in the Attack on Quebec, December 31, 1775, as well as studies for other proposed paintings, the Congress in 1817 voted to commission four large paintings from him, to be hung in the United States Capitol rotunda.

The price was set at $8,000 per painting, with the size and subject matter to be determined by President James Madison. A size of twelve by eighteen feet (370 cm × 550 cm) was agreed, as was the subject matter for the four paintings: the Declaration of Independence, the Surrender of General Burgoyne, the Surrender of Lord Cornwallis, and General George Washington Resigning His Commission. Trumbull spent the next eight years executing the commission, completing this painting in 1820. It was displayed in New York City, Boston, and Baltimore before coming to Washington, D.C., and Trumbull supervised its hanging in the Capitol rotunda in late 1820. It has remained there since.

Trumbull himself cleaned and varnished the painting in 1828, and it has been periodically maintained since. In 1971, damage from a penny that was thrown hard enough to pierce the canvas was repaired. All of the Rotunda paintings were most recently cleaned in 2008.

== Description ==
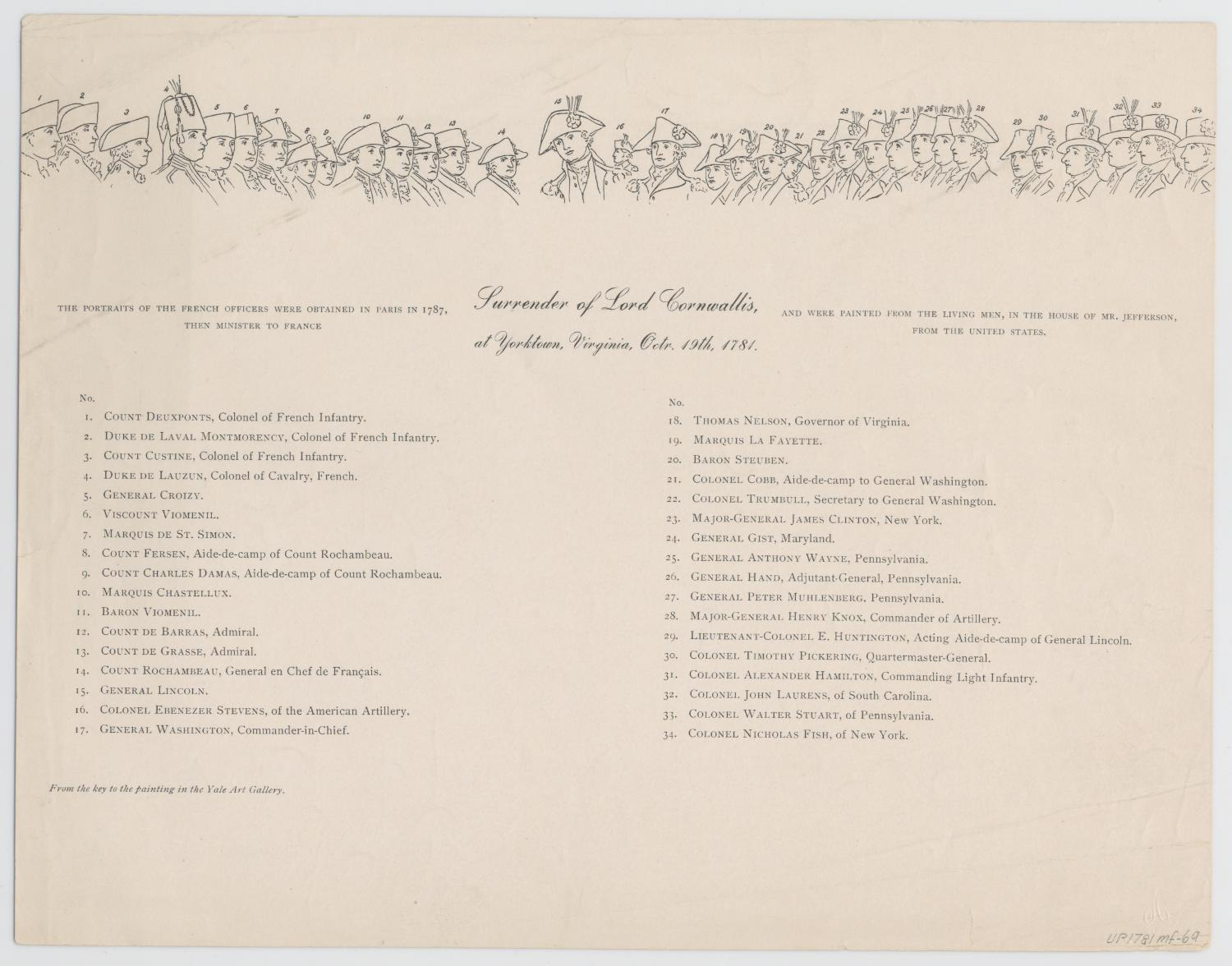
A key prepared by Trumbull identifying the French and American officers in the painting

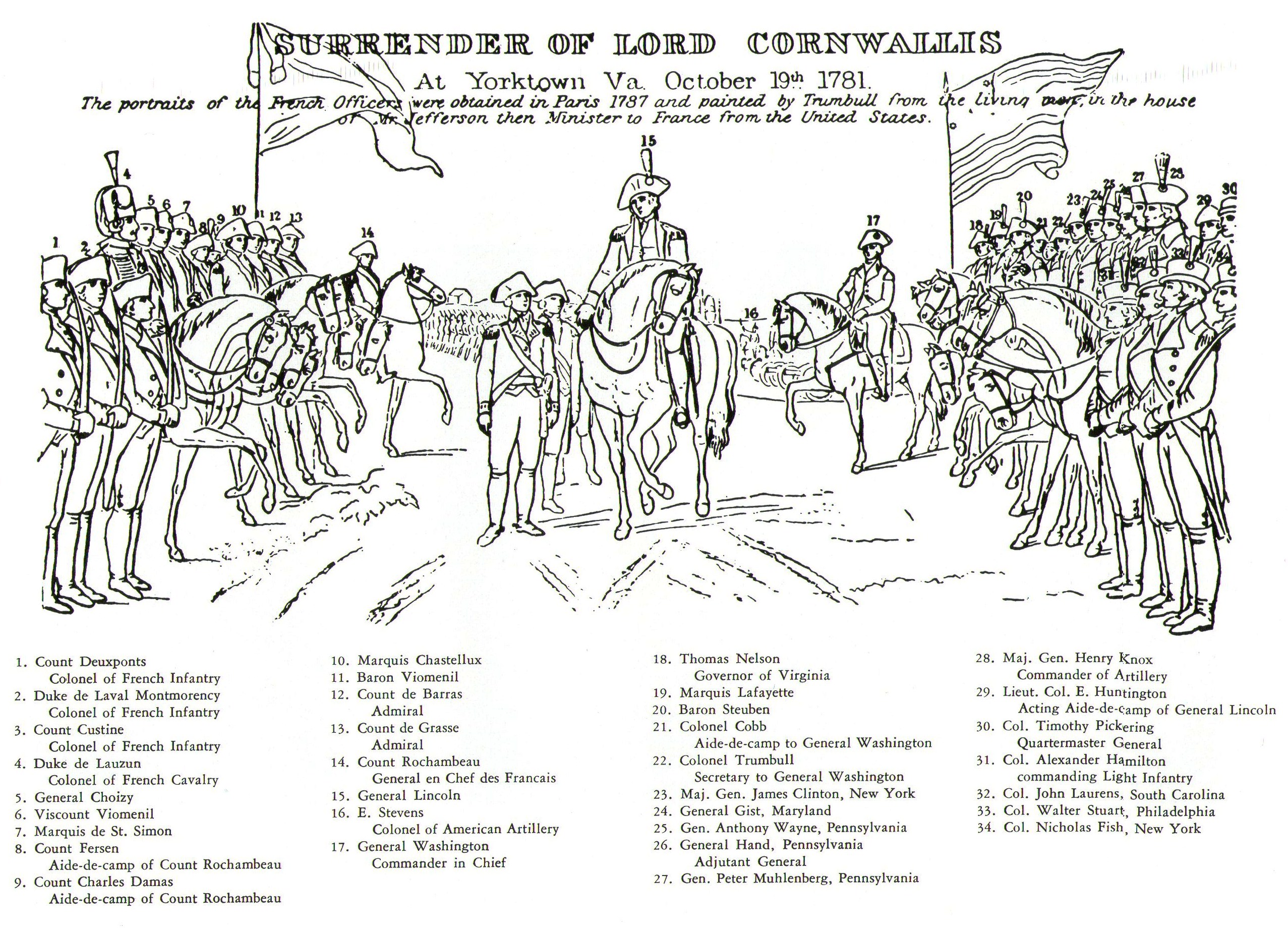
Another key to the painting

The subject of this painting is the surrender of Lord Cornwallis' army at Yorktown, Virginia, in 1781, which ended the last major campaign of the Revolutionary War. The blue sky filled with dark clouds and the broken cannon suggest the battles that led to this event. In early September, entrenched with a force of 7,000 men, Cornwallis had hoped for rescue from a British fleet under Thomas Graves, but Graves' fleet was defeated by the French navy at the Battle of the Chesapeake. Within weeks General Washington had deployed a much larger army, and his artillery bombarded the British positions in early October. After American and French troops overran two British strongholds, Cornwallis surrendered on October 19, 1781.

In the center of the scene, American General Benjamin Lincoln appears mounted on a white horse. He extends his right hand toward the sword carried by the surrendering British officer, General Charles O'Hara, who heads the long line of troops that extends into the background. To the left, French officers appear standing and mounted beneath the white banner of the royal Bourbon family. On the right are American officers beneath the Stars and Stripes; among them are the Marquis de Lafayette and Colonel Jonathan Trumbull, the brother of the painter. General George Washington, riding a brown horse, stayed in the background because Cornwallis himself was not present for the surrender. The Comte de Rochambeau is on the left center on a brown horse.

== See also ==
- Southern theater of the American Revolutionary War
- Convention Army
