= Surrender of General Burgoyne =

1821 painting by John Trumbull

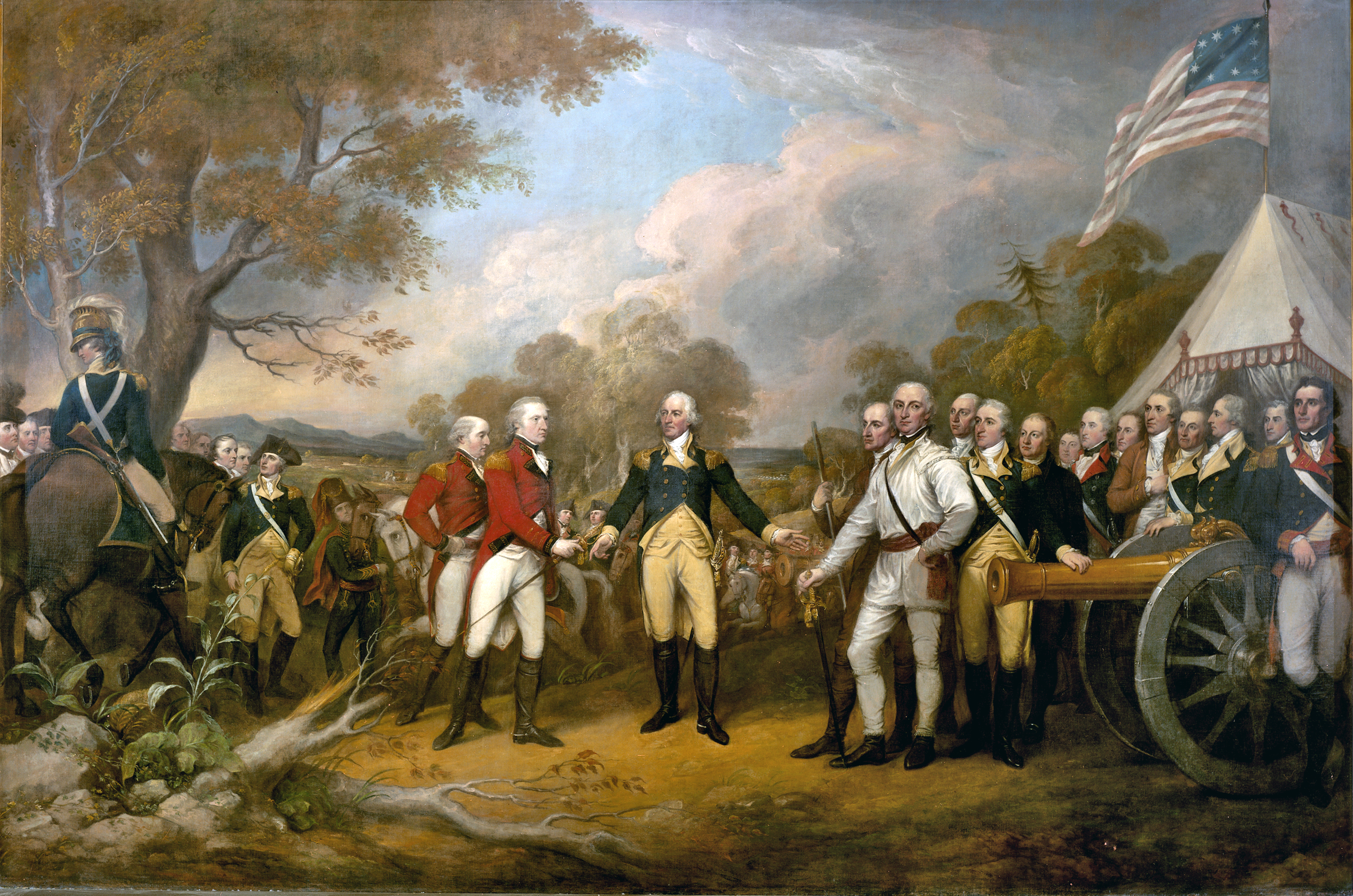
- Artist: John Trumbull
- Year: 1821
- Type: Oil painting
- Dimensions: 3.7 m × 5.5 m (12 ft × 18 ft)
- Location: United States Capitol rotunda, Washington, D.C., U.S.
- Owner: United States

The Surrender of General Burgoyne is an oil painting by the American artist John Trumbull. The painting was completed in 1821 and hangs in the United States Capitol rotunda in Washington, D.C.

The painting depicts the surrender of British Lieutenant General John Burgoyne at Saratoga, New York on October 17, 1777, ten days after the Second Battle of Saratoga. Included in the depiction are many leaders of the American Continental Army and militia forces that took part in the battle as well as the Hessian commander Friedrich Adolf Riedesel and two British Army officers: Burgoyne and General William Phillips.

== Commission ==
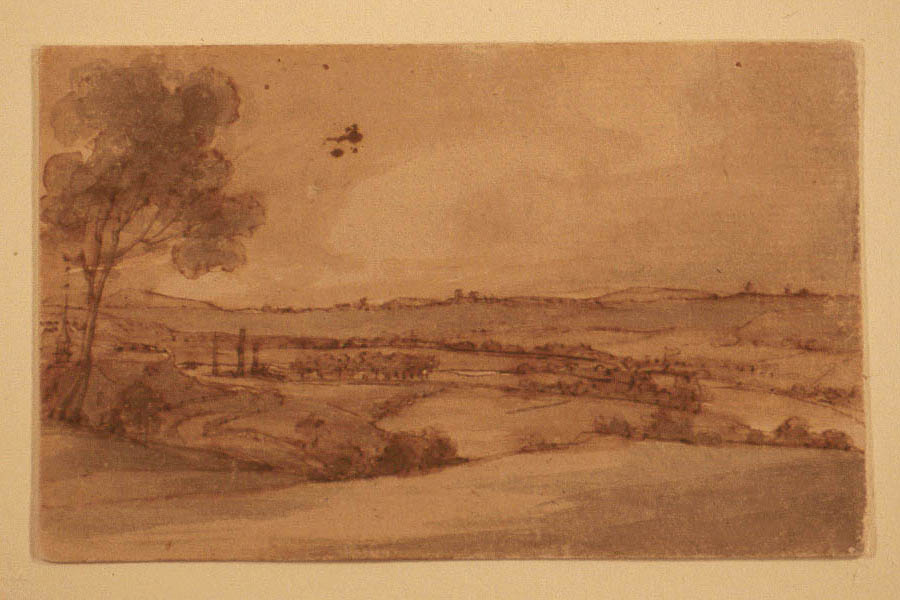
Trumbull's 1791 sketch of Surrender of General Burgoyne that he completed before beginning the portrait, which was finished 30 years later, in 1821

Artist John Trumbull (1756–1843) spent the early part of the American Revolutionary War as a soldier, serving as an aide to both George Washington and Horatio Gates. After resigning from the army in 1777, he pursued a career as an artist. In 1785 he began sketching out ideas for a series of large-scale paintings to commemorate the major events of the American Revolution, and in 1791 he traveled to Saratoga, New York, where he sketched the landscape of the surrender site.

Upon his return from Britain after the end of the War of 1812, he promoted this idea to the United States Congress. On the strength of his application and the successful exhibition of The Death of General Warren at the Battle of Bunker's Hill, June 17, 1775 and The Death of General Montgomery in the Attack on Quebec, December 31, 1775, as well as studies for other proposed paintings, the Congress in 1817 voted to commission four large paintings from him, to be hung in the United States Capitol rotunda.

The price was set at $8,000 per painting, with the size and subject matter to be determined by President James Madison. A size of twelve by eighteen feet (370 cm × 550 cm) was agreed, as was the subject matter for the four paintings: the Declaration of Independence, the Surrender of General Burgoyne, the Surrender of Lord Cornwallis, and General George Washington Resigning His Commission. Trumbull spent the next eight years executing the commission, completing this painting in late 1821. It was first displayed in New York City from January to March 1822, and Trumbull supervised its hanging in the Capitol rotunda in 1824. It has remained there ever since. Trumbull himself cleaned and varnished the painting in 1828, also effecting repairs to an area near Daniel Morgan's foot.

== Description ==
This painting depicts General John Burgoyne prepared to surrender his sword to General Horatio Gates. American officers gather at the sides to witness the event; their varied dress reflects their different units. In the center of the painting, and extending into the background, is Burgoyne's army along with its German reinforcements. They were directed to the camp by American Colonel Lewis, Quartermaster-General, who rides on horseback in the far distance. The scene suggests peace rather than combat or hostility: beneath blue sky and white clouds, officers wear their dress uniforms, weapons are sheathed or slung, and cannons stand silent.

== Other versions ==
Trumbull created a smaller, substantially similar version of the painting that now belongs to the Yale University Art Gallery. The rotunda version was used as the basis for a commemorative stamp issued in 1994.

== People depicted ==
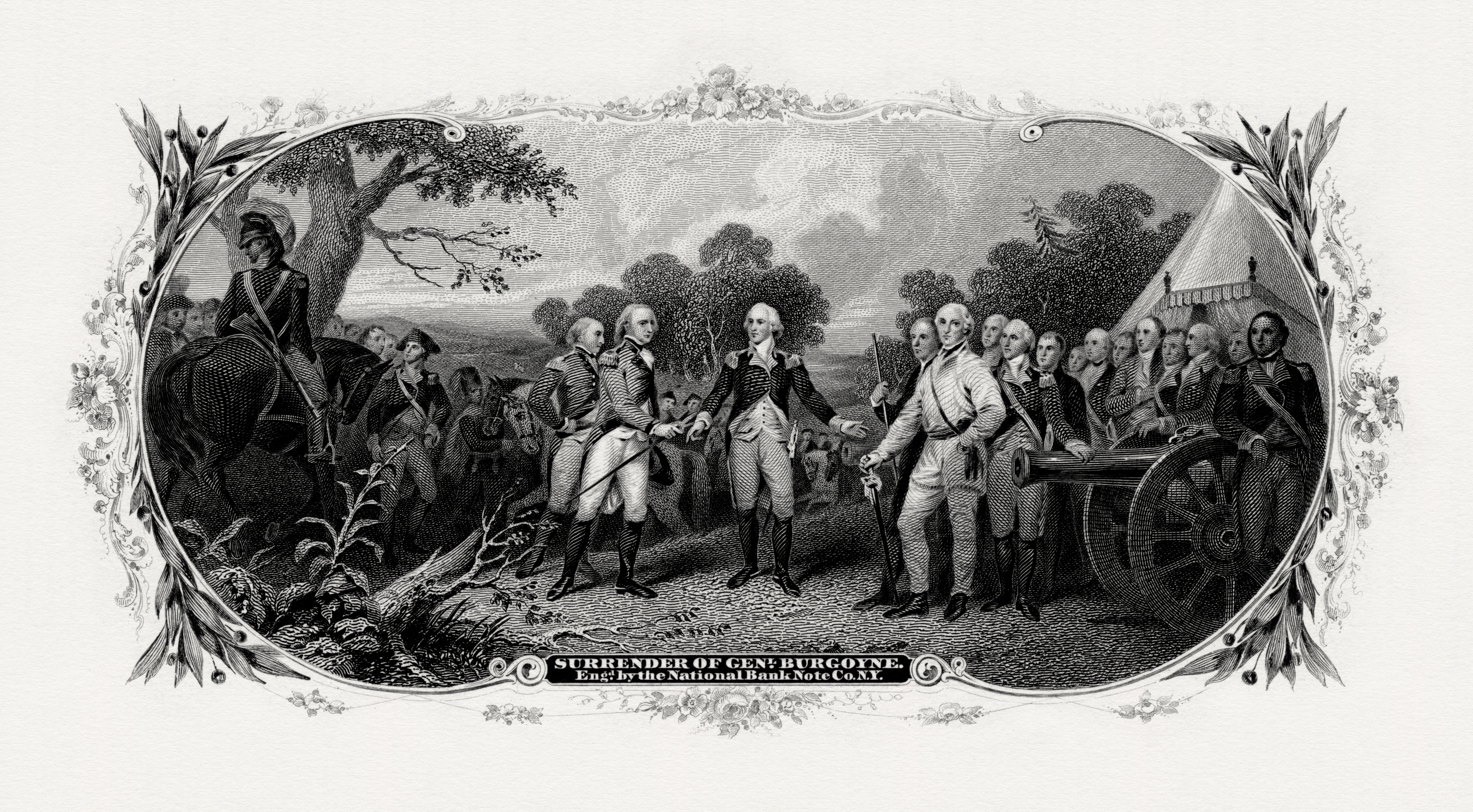
A Bureau of Engraving and Printing vignette used on the reverse of the $500 National Bank Note

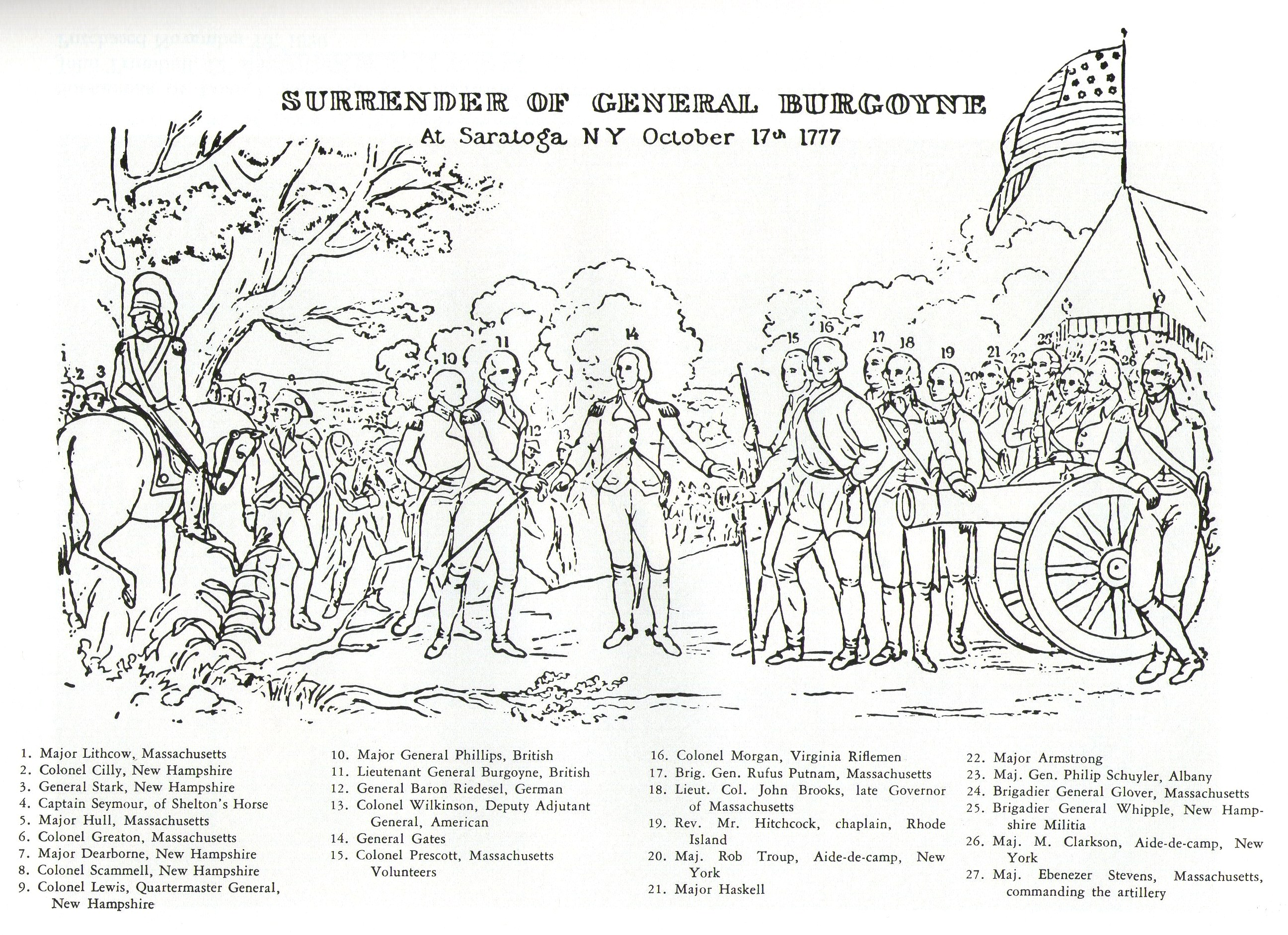
Key to the figures in the painting

Weir provided this list, p. 69. The people depicted are listed approximately from left to right.

- Major Lithgow
- Colonel Joseph Cilley
- Brigadier General John Stark
- Captain Seymour
- Major William Hull
- Colonel Greaton
- Major Henry Dearborn
- Colonel Alexander Scammell
- Colonel Lewis
- Brigadier General William Phillips
- Lieutenant General John Burgoyne
- Lieutenant General Baron Friedrich Adolph Riedesel
- Colonel James Wilkinson
- Major General Horatio Gates
- Colonel William Prescott
- Colonel Daniel Morgan
- Brigadier General Rufus Putnam
- Lieutenant Colonel John Brooks
- Reverend Mr. Hitchcock
- Major Robert Troup
- Major Haskell
- Major Armstrong
- Major General Philip Schuyler
- Brigadier General John Glover
- Brigadier General William Whipple
- Major Matthew Clarkson
- Major Ebenezer Stevens

== See also ==
- List of American Revolutionary War battles
- Saratoga campaign
- Convention Army
