= United States Capitol rotunda =

Component of the United States Capitol

Coordinates: 38°53′23″N 77°00′33″W

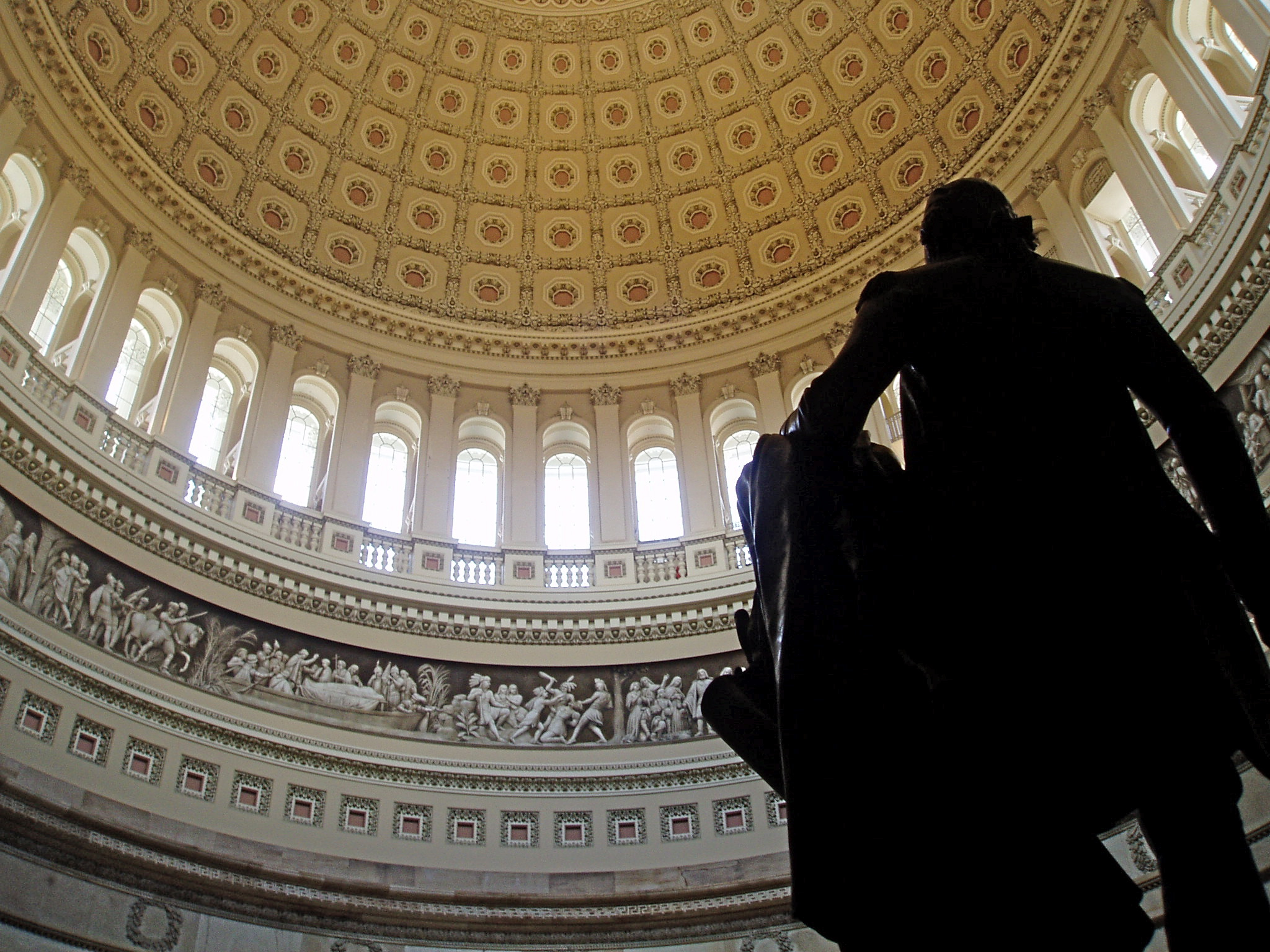
The U.S. Capitol rotunda viewed from behind a copy of the Statue of George Washington in 2005

The United States Capitol building features a central rotunda below the Capitol dome. Built between 1818 and 1824, the rotunda has been described as the Capitol's "symbolic and physical heart".

The rotunda is connected by corridors leading south to the House of Representatives and north to the Senate chambers. To the immediate south is the semi-circular National Statuary Hall, which was the House of Representatives chamber until 1857. To the northeast is the Old Senate Chamber, used by the Senate until 1859 and by the Supreme Court until 1935.

The rotunda is 96 feet (29 m) in diameter, rises 48 feet (15 m) to the top of its original walls and 180 feet 3 inches (54.94 m) to the canopy of the dome, and is usually visited daily by thousands of people. The space is a national showcase of art, and includes numerous historical paintings and sculptures. It is also used for ceremonial or public events authorized by concurrent resolution of both houses of congress, including the lying in state of honored dead.

== Design and construction ==
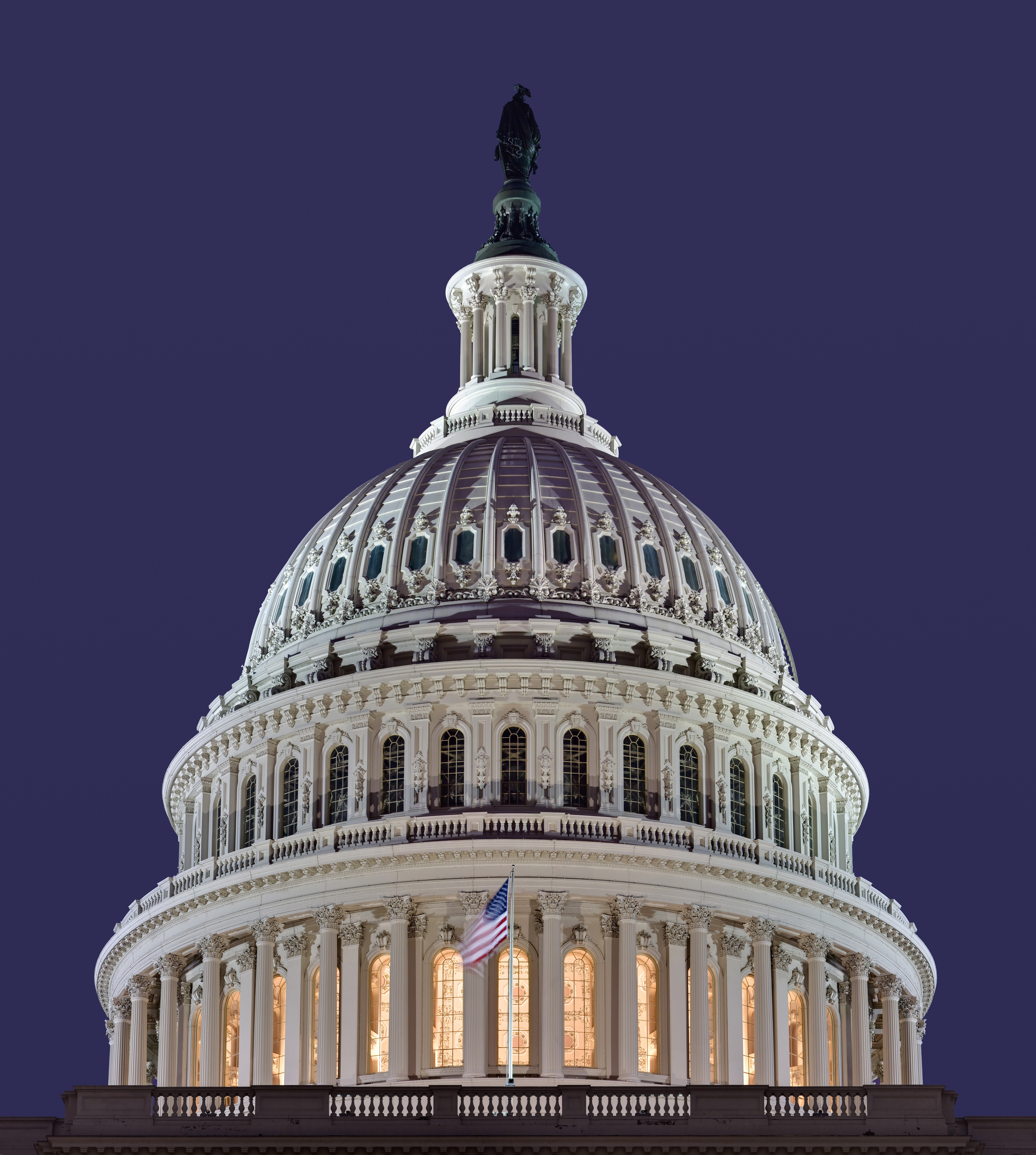
The Capitol dome topped by the Statue of Freedom

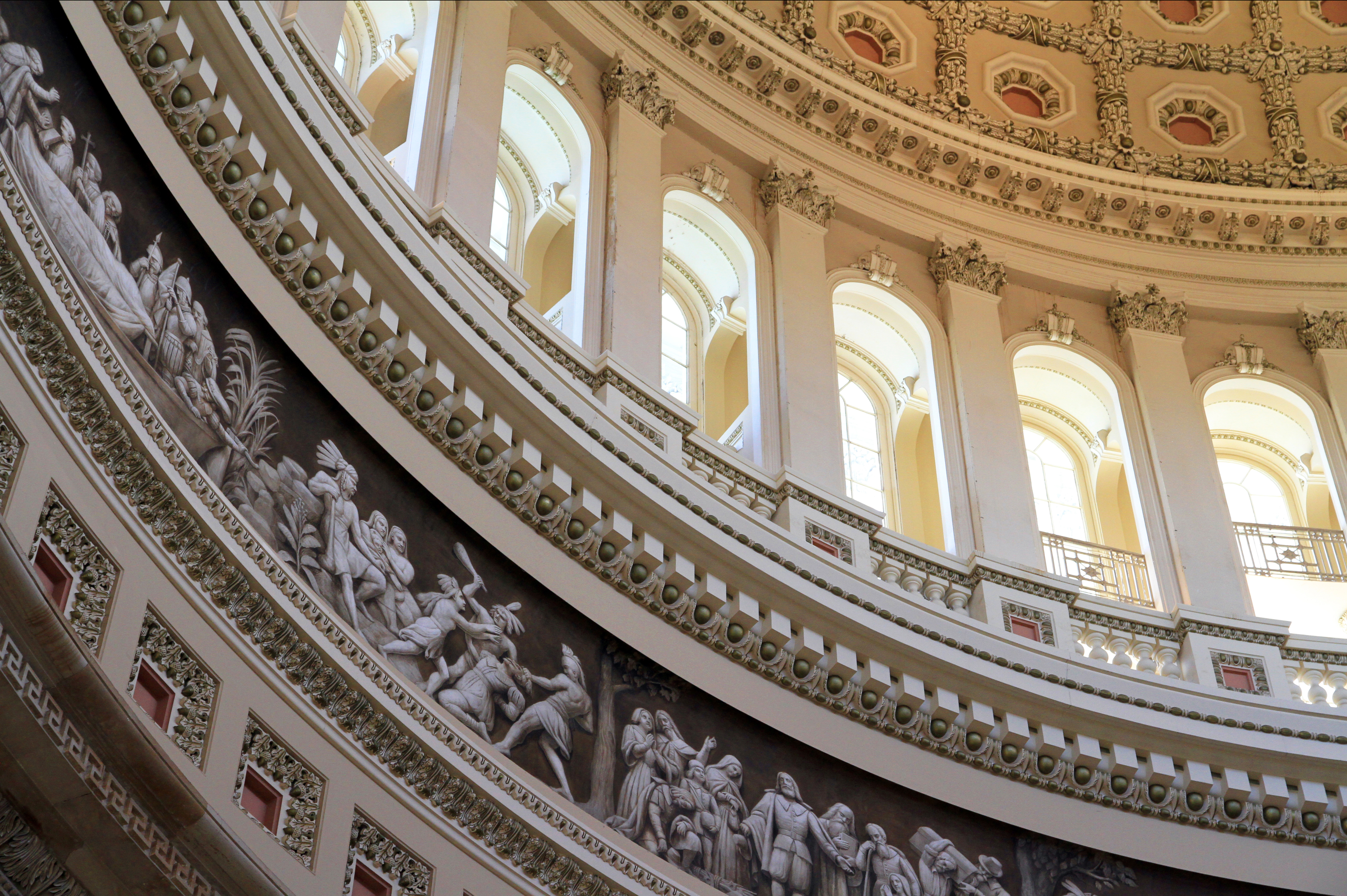
Frieze of American History in the Capitol rotunda

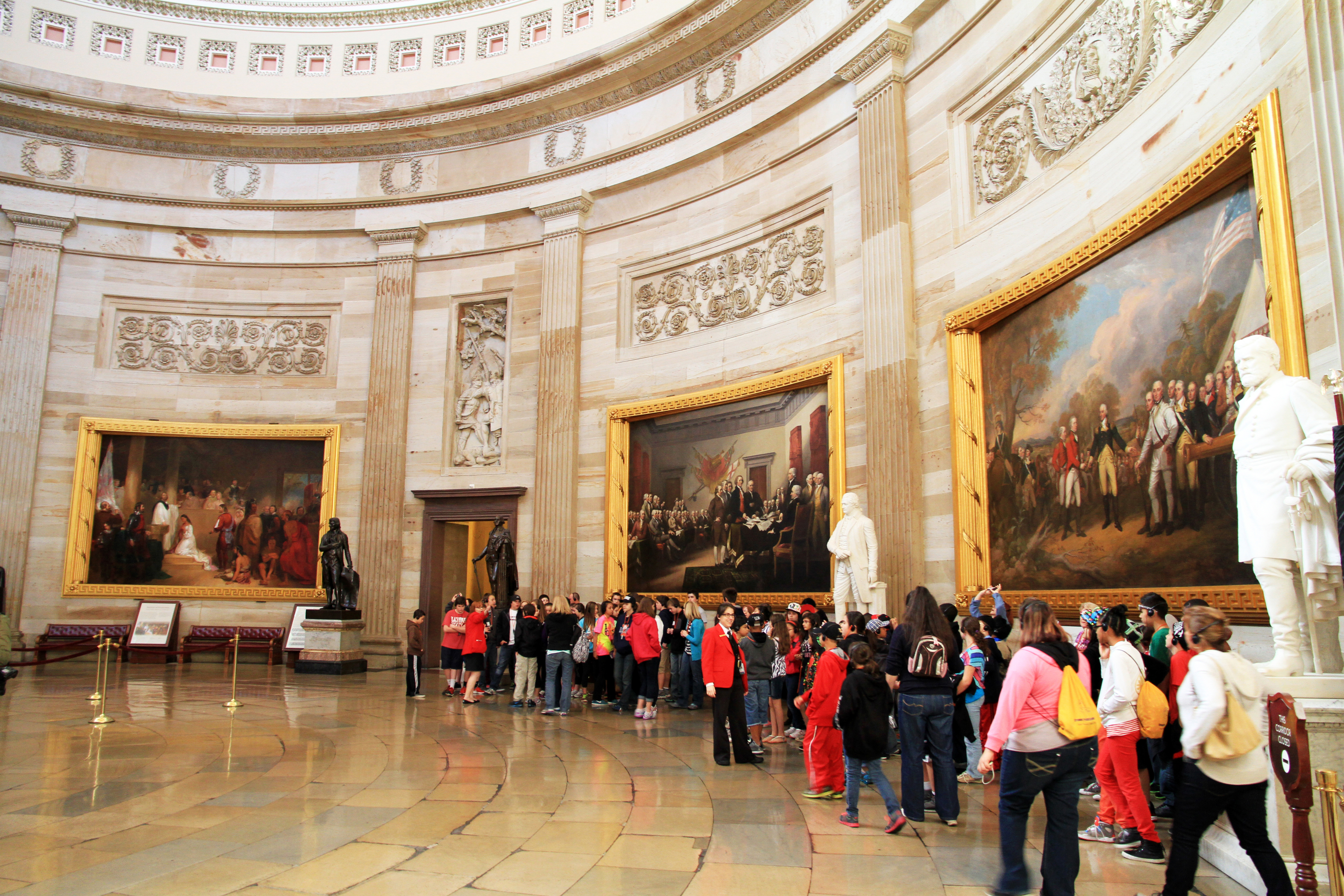
Many large paintings are exhibited in the rotunda

William Thornton, a physician and architect, was the winner of the contest to design the Capitol in 1793. Thornton had first conceived the idea of a central rotunda. However, due to lack of funds or resources, oft-interrupted construction, and the British attack on Washington during the War of 1812, work on the rotunda did not begin until 1818. The rotunda was completed in 1824 under Architect of the Capitol Charles Bulfinch, as part of a series of new buildings and projects in preparation for the final visit of Marquis de Lafayette in 1824. The rotunda was designed in the neoclassical style and was intended to evoke the design of the Pantheon.

The sandstone rotunda walls rise 48 feet (15 m) above the floor. Everything above this, including the Capitol dome, was designed in 1854 by Thomas U. Walter, the fourth Architect of the Capitol. Walter had also designed the Capitol's north and south extensions. Work on the dome began in 1856, and in 1859, Walter redesigned the rotunda to consist of an inner and outer dome, with a canopy suspended between them that would be visible through an oculus at the top of the inner dome. In 1862, Walter asked painter Constantino Brumidi to design "a picture 65 feet (20 m) in diameter, painted in fresco, on the concave canopy over the eye of the New Dome of the U.S. Capitol". At this time, Brumidi may have added a watercolor canopy design over Walter's tentative 1859 sketch. The dome was being finished in the middle of the American Civil War and was constructed from fireproof cast iron. During the Civil War, the rotunda was used as a military hospital for Union soldiers. The dome was finally completed in 1866.

=== The crypt ===
Originally the crypt had an open ceiling into the rotunda. Visitors can still see the holes in the stone circle that marked the rim of the open space in the rotunda floor. Underneath the floor of the crypt lies a tomb that was the intended burial place for George Washington. After a lengthy battle with his estate and the commonwealth of Virginia, however, plans for him to be buried in the crypt were abandoned.

=== Renovation ===
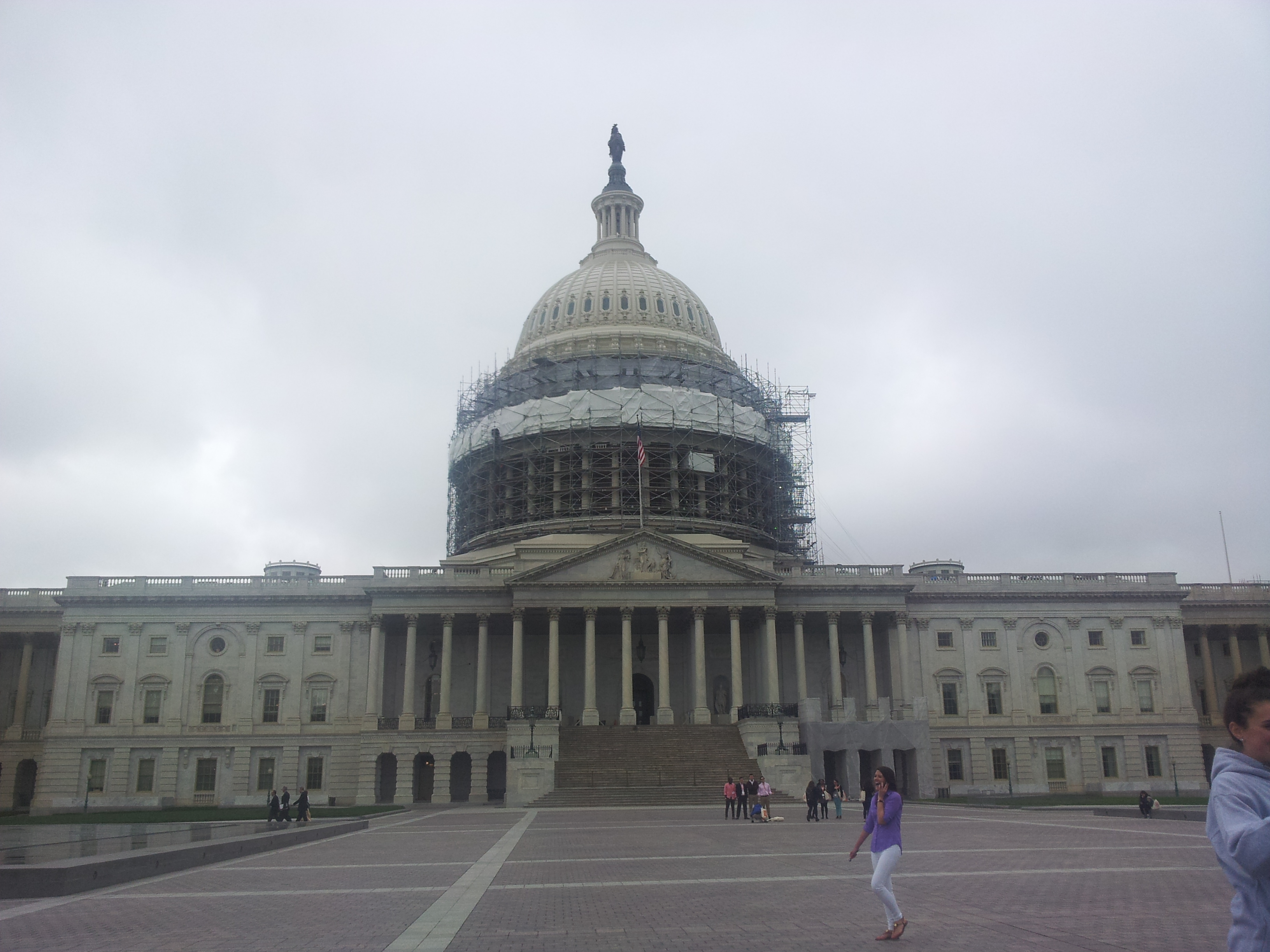
The Capitol dome and rotunda under renovation in May 2016

In January 2013, the Architect of the Capitol announced a four-year, $10 million project to repair and conserve the Capitol Dome's exterior and the Capitol rotunda. The proposal required the stripping of lead paint from the interior of the dome, repair to the ironwork, repainting of the interior of the dome, rehabilitation of the interstitial space between the dome and rotunda, and installation of new lighting in the interstitial space and the rotunda. The dome and rotunda, which were last conserved in 1960, were showing significant signs of rust and disrepair. There was a danger that decorative ironwork could have fallen from the rotunda to the space below, and that weather-related problems could damage the artwork in the rotunda. Without immediate repair, safety netting was installed, temporarily blocking the rotunda's artwork from view.

== Historical paintings ==
Eight niches in the rotunda hold large, framed historical paintings. All are oil-on-canvas and measure 12 by 18 feet (3.7 by 5.5 metres). Four of these are scenes from the American Revolution, painted by John Trumbull, who was commissioned by Congress to do the work in 1817. These are Declaration of Independence, Surrender of General Burgoyne, Surrender of Lord Cornwallis, and General George Washington Resigning His Commission. These were placed between 1819 and 1824. Between 1840 and 1855, four more paintings were added. These depicted the exploration and colonization of America and were all done by different artists. These paintings are Landing of Columbus by John Vanderlyn, Discovery of the Mississippi by William Henry Powell, Baptism of Pocahontas by John Gadsby Chapman, and Embarkation of the Pilgrims by Robert Walter Weir.

Painting	Artist	Dates	Description	Notes
Declaration of Independence	John Trumbull	Commissioned 1817, purchased 1819, placed 1826	John Adams, Roger Sherman, Robert R. Livingston, Benjamin Franklin, and the principal author, Thomas Jefferson — members of the Committee of Five, who drafted the Declaration of Independence, which was presented to the Second Continental Congress and President John Hancock on June 28, 1776 at Independence Hall in Philadelphia.	The first painting Trumbull completed for the rotunda and probably the most widely recognized, the iconic Declaration of Independence is somewhat historically inaccurate and anachronistic. Of the 56 signers, 42 are represented. The rest are absent, possibly because they were not present at the adoption of the declaration or had died by the time of Trumbull's painting. Four are included who did not sign, but whom Trumbull found worthy of inclusion: George Clinton, Robert R. Livingston, Thomas Willing, and John Dickinson. A reproduction appears on the United States two-dollar bill.
Surrender of General Burgoyne	John Trumbull	Commissioned 1817, purchased 1822, placed 1826	British soldiers under General John Burgoyne surrender after the American victory at the Battle of Saratoga in 1777. The central figure, from the Continental Army, is General Horatio Gates, who refused to accept the traditional sword of surrender that Burgoyne offered. Instead, treating his former foe as a gentleman, General Gates invited General Burgoyne into his tent. The other Americans, shown to the right, are officers serving in the Continental Army.	Trumbull planned this outdoor scene to contrast with Declaration of Independence (above), displayed beside it on the wall of the U.S. Capitol rotunda. Both paintings show large groups of people, but one is an indoor scene, while the other is an outdoor scene of similar perspective. The battle was a key victory for the Americans, prevented the division of New England, and secured French military assistance to the Americans.
Surrender of Lord Cornwallis	John Trumbull	commissioned 1817, placed 1820	A combined American-French force led by George Washington, the Marquis de Lafayette, and Comte de Rochambeau accept the final surrender of British troops under Lord Cornwallis after the Battle of Yorktown in 1781. American General Benjamin Lincoln is portrayed at the center of the painting riding a white horse, with French officers on the left and Americans on the right, led by Washington on the brown horse. The British were represented by officers, but Lord Cornwallis himself was not present and was represented instead by Charles O'Hara.	The scene here depicts the same event as the "Surrender of Cornwallis" panel of the "Frieze of American History". Trumbull was proud of the fact that he had painted portraits of the French officers while in France and included a small self-portrait of himself under the American flag on the right side of the painting. As noted above, Washington declined O'Hara's sword because according to the custom of the time it would only be proper for Washington to receive the sword from Cornwallis himself; Major General Lincoln accepted the sword in Washington's place. The surrender led to the cessation of major Revolutionary War hostilities and British recognition of American independence in the 1783 Treaty of Paris.
General George Washington Resigning His Commission	John Trumbull	commissioned 1817, placed 1824	George Washington addresses Congress to resign his commission as commander-in-chief of the Continental Army, on December 23, 1783. Washington is depicted along with two aides-de-camp, as he addresses the president of the Congress. Also shown in the painting are Thomas Mifflin, Elbridge Gerry, and three future U.S. presidents: Thomas Jefferson, James Monroe, and James Madison. His wife, Martha Washington, and her three grandchildren, are shown watching from the gallery section (balcony area at right), although they were not in fact present at Washington's resignation.	This celebrated incident established a strong tradition of civilian control of the military in the United States and the rejection of military dictatorship in favor of liberal democracy. The U.S. Congress, at the time, was meeting at the Maryland State House in Annapolis.
Landing of Columbus	John Vanderlyn	commissioned 1836/1837, placed 1847	In the foreground, Christopher Columbus raises the royal banner to claim the land for Kingdom of Castile, and he stands bareheaded with his hat at his feet in honor of the sanctity of the event. The captains of the ships Niña and Pinta follow, carrying the banner of the Catholic Monarchs, Isabella I of Castile and Ferdinand II of Aragon. The crew displays a range of emotions, and some search for gold in the sand. Nearby, natives watch from behind a tree at the right.	Columbus landed in the West Indies, on San Salvador Island (Guanahani), on October 12, 1492.
Discovery of the Mississippi	William Henry Powell	commissioned 1847, purchased 1855	At the center of the canvas, Spanish navigator and conquistador Hernando de Soto rides a white horse. De Soto and his troops approach Native Americans in front of tepees, with a chief holding a ceremonial pipe. The foreground is filled by weapons and soldiers to represent the devastating battle at Mauvila (or Mabila), in which de Soto suffered a Pyrrhic victory over Choctaws under Tuscaloosa. To the right, a monk prays as a large crucifix is set into the ground.	Discovery of the Mississippi was the last painting to be commissioned by Congress for the rotunda. De Soto is thought to have become the first European to see the Mississippi River in 1541.
Baptism of Pocahontas	John Gadsby Chapman	commissioned 1837, placed 1840	Dressed in white, Pocahontas kneels, surrounded by family members, including her father, Chief Powhatan, and several Jamestown colonists. Her brother Nantequas turns away from the ceremony. The baptism occurred before her marriage to the tobacco planter John Rolfe, who stands behind her.	Pocahontas was baptized (under the name "Rebecca") by the Anglican priest Alexander Whitaker in Jamestown, Virginia. This event is believed to have taken place in 1613, and the marriage between Rolfe and Pocahontas helped to establish peaceful relations between the Jamestown colonists and the Tidewater tribes.
Embarkation of the Pilgrims	Robert Walter Weir	commissioned 1837, placed 1844	The Pilgrims appear on the deck of the ship Speedwell as they depart Delfshaven in South Holland on July 22, 1620. William Brewster, holding the Bible, and pastor John Robinson lead Governor Carver, William Bradford, Miles Standish, and their families in prayer. The rainbow, at the left side of the painting, symbolizes hope and divine protection.	The Pilgrims traveled aboard the Speedwell to Southampton. There they met additional colonists and transferred to the Mayflower.

=== Apotheosis of Washington ===
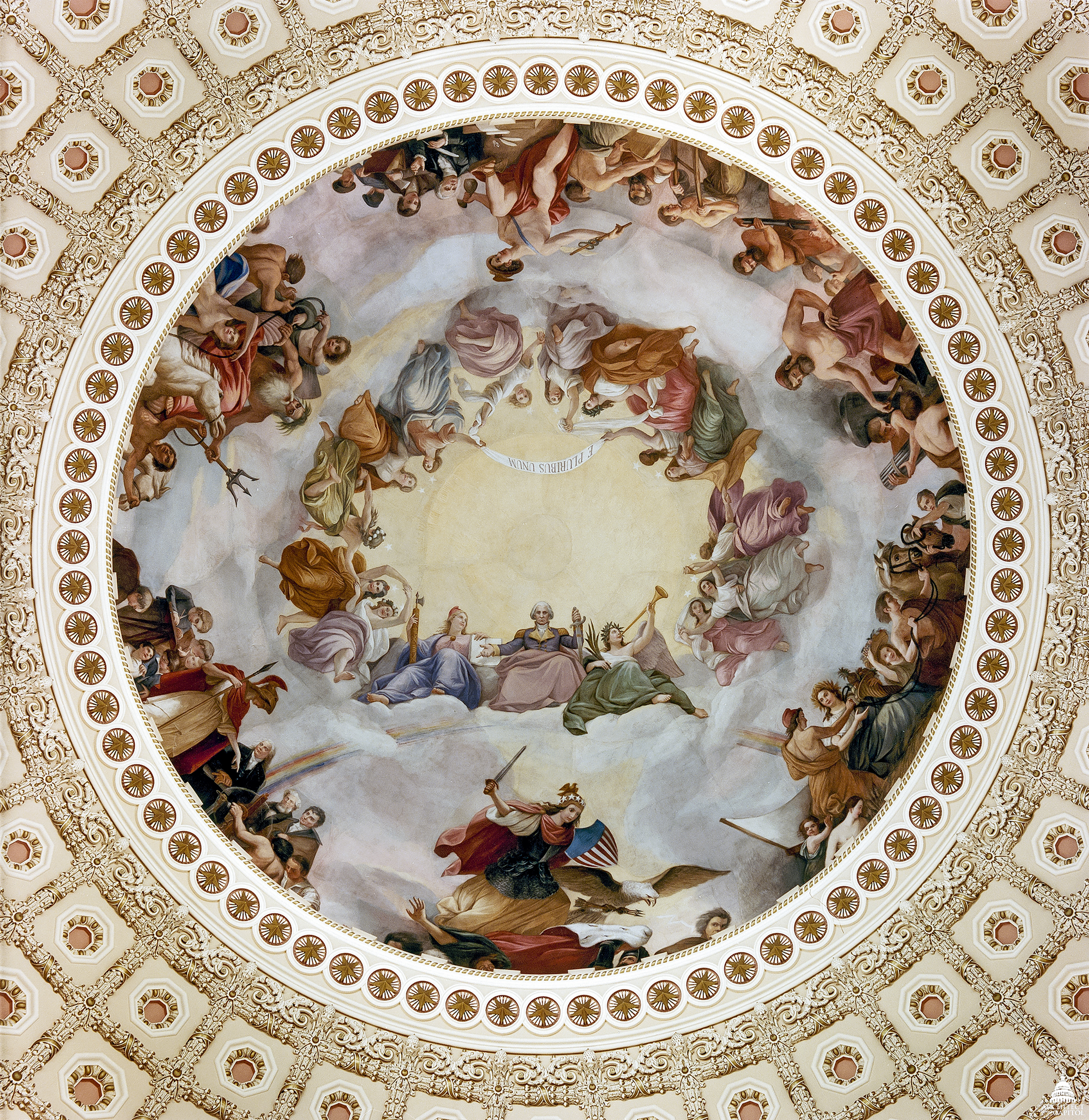
The Apotheosis of Washington, as seen looking up from the rotunda

The Apotheosis of Washington is a large fresco by Greek-Italian Constantino Brumidi, visible through the oculus of the dome of the rotunda. The fresco depicts George Washington sitting exalted amongst the heavens. It is suspended 180 feet (55 m) above the rotunda floor and covers an area of 4,664 square feet (433.3 m^{2}).

=== Frieze of American History ===
The Frieze of American History is painted to appear as a carved stone bas-relief frieze but is actually a trompe-l'œil fresco cycle depicting 19 scenes from American history. The "frieze" occupies a band immediately below the 36 windows. Brumidi designed the frieze and prepared a sketch in 1859 but did not begin painting until 1878. Brumidi painted seven and a half scenes. While working on William Penn and the Indians, Brumidi fell off the scaffolding and held on to a rail for 15 minutes until he was rescued. He died a few months later in 1880. After Brumidi's death, Filippo Costaggini was commissioned to complete the eight and a half remaining scenes in Brumidi's sketches. He finished in 1889 and left a 31-foot (9 m) gap due to an error in Brumidi's original design. In 1951, Allyn Cox completed the frieze.

Except for the last three panels named by Allyn Cox, the scenes have no particular titles and many variant titles have been given. The names given here are the names used by the Architect of the Capitol, which uses the names that Brumidi used most frequently in his letters and that were used in Edward Clark and by newspaper articles. The 19 panels are:

Scene	Artist	Year	Description
America and History	Constantino Brumidi	1878	This is the first panel and the only allegorical one, portraying a personification of America, wearing a liberty cap, with spear and shield in the center, surrounded by other allegorical figures. To the right is a Native American maiden with a bow and arrows, representing the wild North American continent. At America's feet is a female personification of History, with a stone tablet to record events. To the left of History is an eagle, perched on a fasces, the ancient Roman bundle of birch rods symbolizing authority. To the left of America is another eagle, carrying the olive branch of peace. To the center-left in the background is a man in same pose as the prospector at the end of "Discovery of Gold in California"; this is because Brumidi planned to have the scene connect with his planned last one.
Landing of Columbus	Constantino Brumidi		Christopher Columbus is depicted arriving in the Americas in the first of four scenes of the Spanish conquest. Columbus disembarks off a plank from the Santa María. His crew, armed with weapons, stays aboard; one crew member has a spyglass. Native Americans are portrayed greeting Columbus. Indian women and children are shown, along with native warriors to the right. The Columbus figure may have been based on Luigi Persico statue of Columbus, which was at the time of the painting on the east central steps of the Capitol.
Cortez and Montezuma at Mexican Temple	Constantino Brumidi		This panel shows the Spanish conquistador Hernán Cortés entering an Aztec temple, being welcomed by Moctezuma II. At the beginning of the Spanish conquest of the Aztec Empire, Moctezuma and the Aztecs honored Cortés as a god, believing that he was the returning god Quetzalcoatl. The Aztec calendar stone and cult images are based on sketches drawn by Brumidi in Mexico City.
Pizarro Going to Peru	Constantino Brumidi		Spanish conquistador Francisco Pizarro is depicted leading his horse through the jungle in search of El Dorado, the mythical land of gold, in this representation of the Spanish conquest of the Inca Empire.
Burial of DeSoto	Constantino Brumidi		This panel depicts the burial of Spanish explorer Hernando de Soto in the Mississippi River after his death from a fever. De Soto led the largest European expedition of both 15th and 16th centuries through the Southeast and Midwest searching for gold, silver, and other valuables.
Captain Smith and Pocahontas	Constantino Brumidi		Pocahontas is portrayed saving Captain John Smith, one of the founders of Jamestown, Virginia, from being clubbed to death.
Landing of the Pilgrims	Constantino Brumidi		Pilgrims led by William Brewster give thanks to God for their safe voyage aboard the Mayflower in this scene depicting Plymouth Colony.
William Penn and the Indians	Constantino Brumidi; Completed by Filippo Costaggini	1880	Quaker leader and Province of Pennsylvania founder William Penn is depicted with Lenape (Delaware) Native Americans under the elm tree at Shackamaxon. This is the last panel on which Brumidi worked.
Colonization of New England	Constantino Brumidi; Completed by Filippo Costaggini		This panel shows New England settlers busily logging, sawing, and using lumber to construct a building. This is the first scene painted entirely by Filippo Costaggini.
Oglethorpe and the Indians	Constantino Brumidi; Completed by Filippo Costaggini		James Oglethorpe, founder of Georgia Colony and first Georgia governor, is shown with the Muskogee (Creek) leaders in Savannah, Georgia. The Muskogee present Oglethorpe with a buffalo skin with an eagle in the center, a symbol of friendship and trust.
Battle of Lexington	Constantino Brumidi; Completed by Filippo Costaggini		This panel depicts the "shot heard 'round the world" at the Battle of Lexington, the first major battle of the American Revolutionary War. Major John Pitcairn is shown on horseback at center, with British regulars to the right and Lexington militiamen at left.
Reading of the Declaration of Independence	Constantino Brumidi; Completed by Filippo Costaggini		Idealized depiction of John Adams, Thomas Jefferson, and Benjamin Franklin, authors of the Declaration of Independence, reading the declaration to celebrating colonists.
Surrender of Cornwallis	Constantino Brumidi; Completed by Filippo Costaggini		Depiction of George Washington on horseback receiving the ceremonial sword of surrender from Charles O'Hara, who represented Lord Cornwallis during the surrender ceremony that marked the end of the siege of Yorktown. In reality, it is thought that Washington declined O'Hara's sword because according to the custom of the time it would only be proper for Washington to receive the sword from Cornwallis himself; Major General Benjamin Lincoln instead accepted the sword.
Death of Tecumseh	Constantino Brumidi; Completed by Filippo Costaggini		This panel depicts the death of Shawnee chief and Indian Confederation leader Tecumseh at the Battle of the Thames in Upper Canada during the War of 1812 (partially an extension of Tecumseh's War).
American Army Entering the City of Mexico	Constantino Brumidi; Completed by Filippo Costaggini		U.S. Army troops led by Winfield Scott enter Mexico City after the fall of Mexico City, which ended the Mexican–American War with a decisive U.S. victory. The 1848 Treaty of Guadalupe Hidalgo, which provided for the massive Mexican Cession of territory in what is now the Western United States.
Discovery of Gold in California	Constantino Brumidi; Completed by Filippo Costaggini	1889	Prospectors dig and pan for gold with picks, shovels, and other tools in this depiction of the California Gold Rush. In the center, three men (one possibly representing John Sutter) examine a prospector's pan. This was the last scene designed by Brumidi and painted by Costaggini.
Peace at the End of the Civil War	Allyn Cox		This scene, the first of Cox's three panels, depicts a Confederate soldier and a Union soldier shaking hands at the end of the American Civil War, symbolizing reconciliation and reunification. The cotton plant and the Northern pine tree symbolize the South and the North.
Naval Gun Crew in the Spanish–American War	Allyn Cox		A group of United States Navy sailors in a gun crew are depicted in a naval battle during the Spanish–American War. and the United States won a victory over Spain in the war. The 1898 Treaty of Paris provided for Cuba's independence from Spain and the U.S. acquisition of Puerto Rico, Guam, and the Philippines.
The Birth of Aviation	Allyn Cox	1951	This scene depicts the Wright brothers' first flight at Kitty Hawk in 1903. The Wright Flyer is shown just off the ground, with Orville Wright in the plane and Wilbur Wright running alongside to steady the wing. To the left are Leonardo da Vinci, Samuel Pierpont Langley, and Octave Chanute, other aviation pioneers, holding models of other early flying machines. An eagle holds an olive branch in the bottom right.

== Statues ==
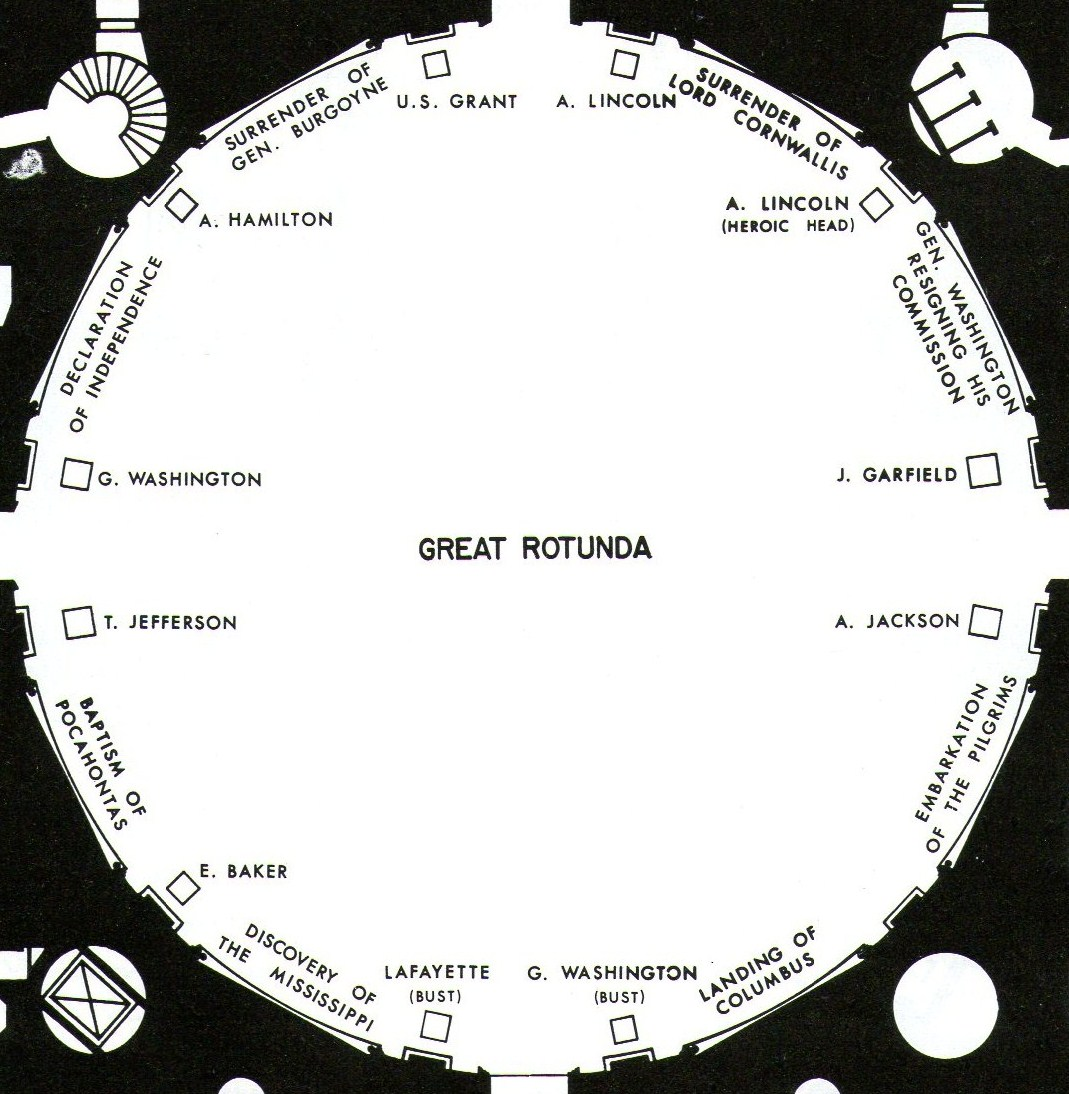
Floor plan showing locations of rotunda paintings, statues and busts in 1978 (prior to the addition of the Truman, Eisenhower, Ford, and Reagan statues, the King bust, and the Women's Suffrage Monument)

=== From the Statuary Hall Collection ===
Among the group of eleven statues currently encircling the rotunda against the wall at floor level are seven from the National Statuary Hall Collection:

- George Washington, in bronze, from Virginia, by Jean Antoine Houdon (copy cast in 1934).
- Andrew Jackson in bronze, from Tennessee, by Belle Kinney Sholz and Leopold F. Sholz, in 1928.
- James Garfield in marble, from Ohio, by Charles Niehaus in 1886.
- Dwight D. Eisenhower in bronze, from Kansas, by Jim Brothers in 2003.
- Ronald Reagan in bronze, from California, by Chas Fagan in 2009.
- Gerald Ford in bronze, from Michigan, by J. Brett Grill in 2011.
- Harry S. Truman in bronze, from Missouri, by Tom Corbin in 2022.

These seven statues representing the presidents will remain in the rotunda indefinitely or until an act of Congress.

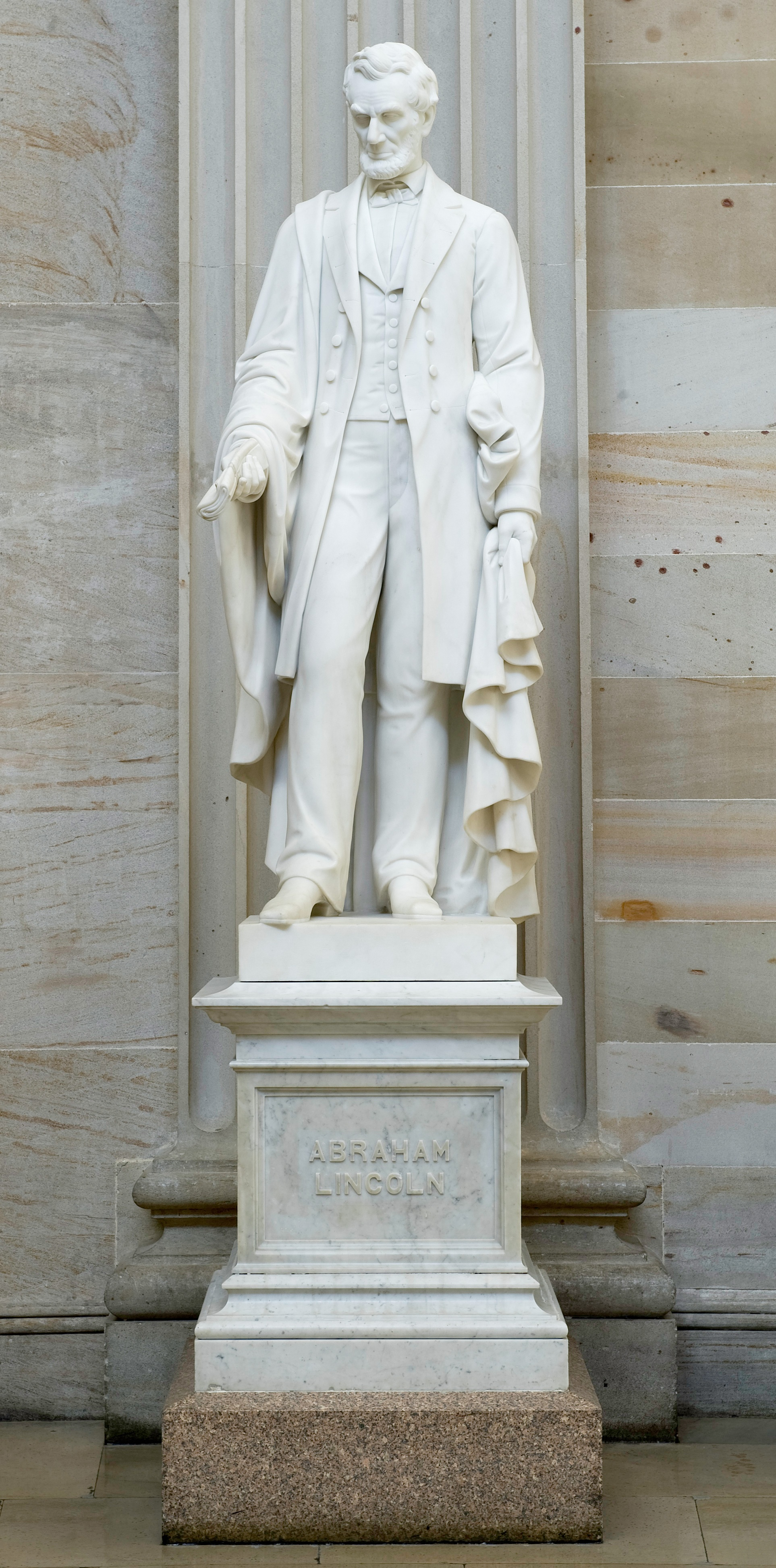
Abraham Lincoln (1871, marble) by Vinnie Ream

=== George Washington ===
A statue of George Washington – a copy after French neo-classical sculptor Jean-Antoine Houdon's 1790 full-length marble in the Virginia State Capitol – holds a prominent place. William James Hubard created a plaster copy after Houdon, that stood in the Rotunda from the late-1850s to 1934. It is now in the Smithsonian American Art Museum. The present bronze copy replaced Hubard's plaster copy in 1934.

=== James Garfield ===
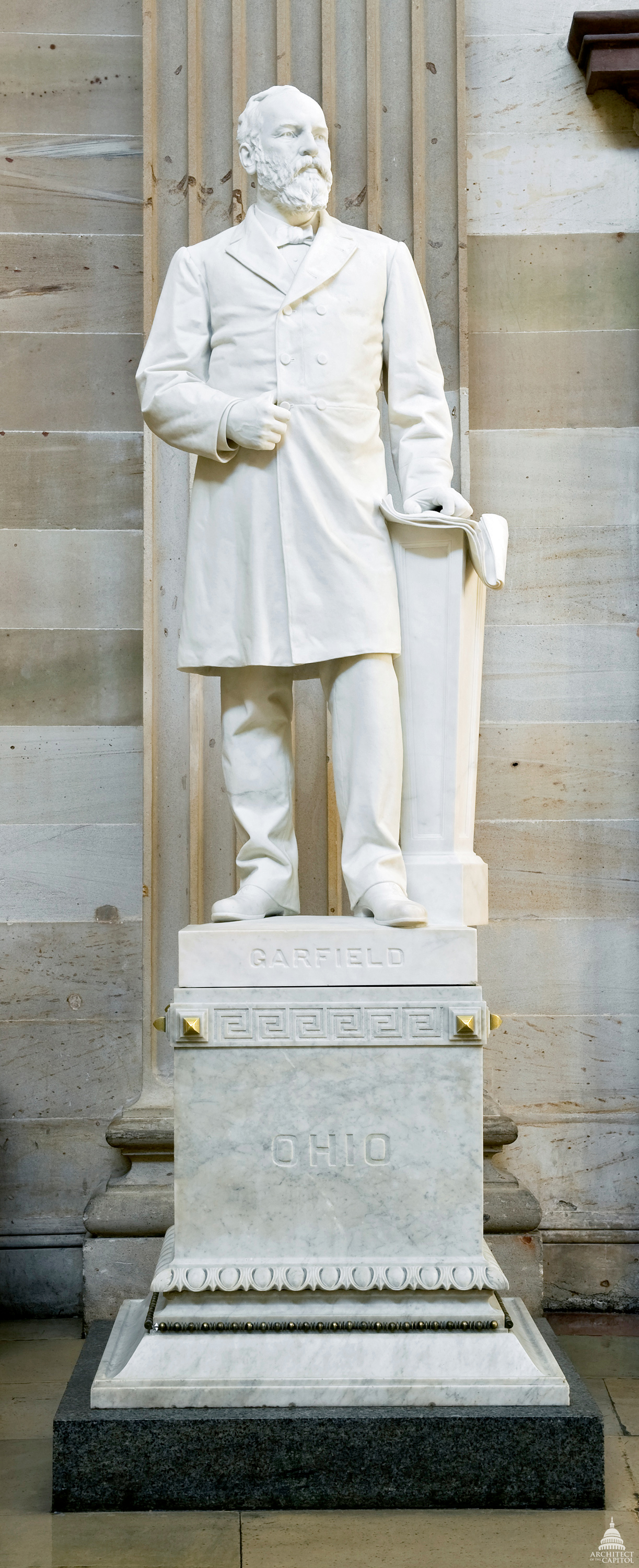
James Garfield by Charles Niehaus

James Garfield was the last American president to be born in a log cabin. Sculptor Niehaus returned to America in 1881 and by virtue of being a native Ohioan was commissioned to sculpt a monument to the recently assassinated President James Garfield, who was also from Ohio.

=== Bust of Martin Luther King, Jr. ===
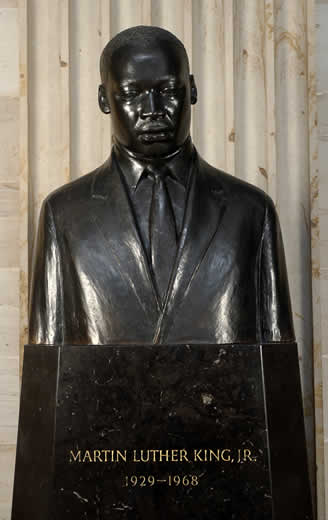
Martin Luther King, Jr., is one of two African-Americans honored with a bust in the United States Capitol

The bust of his head and shoulders is 36 inches (91 cm) high and stands on a pyramidal Belgian black marble base that is 66 inches (168 cm) high. Because the bust would be such an important and visible work of art, the Joint Committee on the Library decided to have a national competition to select a sculptor.

On December 21, 1982, the Congress passed House Concurrent Resolution 153, which directed the procurement of a marble bust "to serve to memorialize King's contributions on such matters as the historic legislation of the 1960s affecting civil rights and the right to vote". Senator Charles Mathias, Jr., chairman of the Joint Committee on the Library, the congressional committee overseeing the procurement, said at the unveiling that "Martin Luther King takes his rightful place among the heroes of this nation."

John Woodrow Wilson, the artist, was awarded a $50,000 commission to cast the model in bronze. The bust was unveiled in the Rotunda on January 16, 1986, the fifty-seventh anniversary of King's birth, by his wife Coretta Scott King, their four children, and Dr. King's sister Christine King Farris.

=== Women's suffrage ===
This group portrait monument is known formally as the Portrait Monument to Lucretia Mott, Elizabeth Cady Stanton, and Susan B. Anthony, pioneers of the women's suffrage movement in the United States. Their efforts, and the work of later suffrage activists like Alice Paul, eventually led to the passage of the 19th Amendment in 1920. The work was sculpted by Adelaide Johnson (1859–1955) from a 16,000-pound (7,300 kg) block of marble in Carrara, Italy. The portraits are copies of the individual busts she carved for the Court of Honor of the Woman's Building at the World's Columbian Exposition in 1893. The detailed busts are surrounded by rough-hewn marble at the top of the sculpture. This part of the statue, according to some, is left unfinished representing the unfinished work of women's rights. Contrary to a popular story, the intention was not that it be completed upon the ascension of the first female President — the rough-hewn section is too small to carry a proportional bust. The monument was presented to the Capitol as a gift from the women of the United States by the National Woman's Party and was accepted on behalf of Congress by the Joint Committee on the Library on February 10, 1921. The unveiling ceremony was held in the Rotunda on February 15, 1921, the 101st anniversary of the birth of Susan B. Anthony, and was attended by representatives of over 70 women's organizations. Shortly after its unveiling, however, the statue was moved into the Capitol Crypt. It remained on display there for 75 years, until HCR 216 ordered it moved to the Rotunda. The statue was placed in its current location, in the Rotunda, in May 1997.

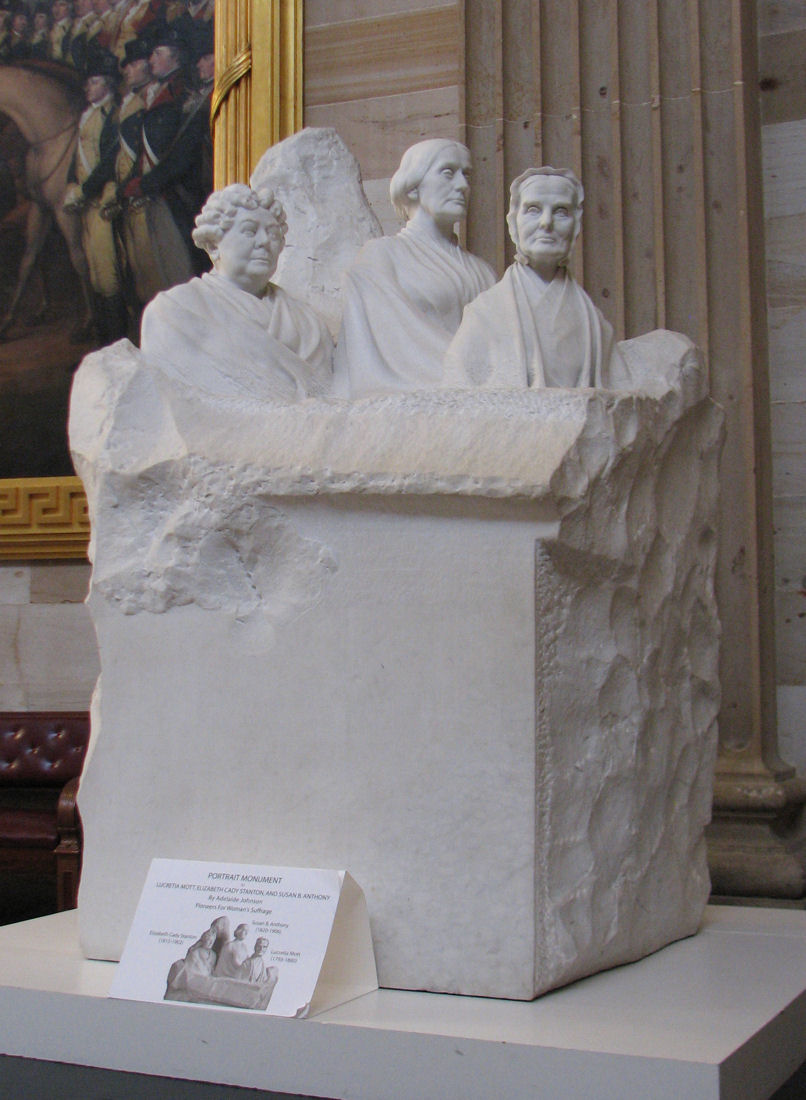
The Portrait Monument (1920)

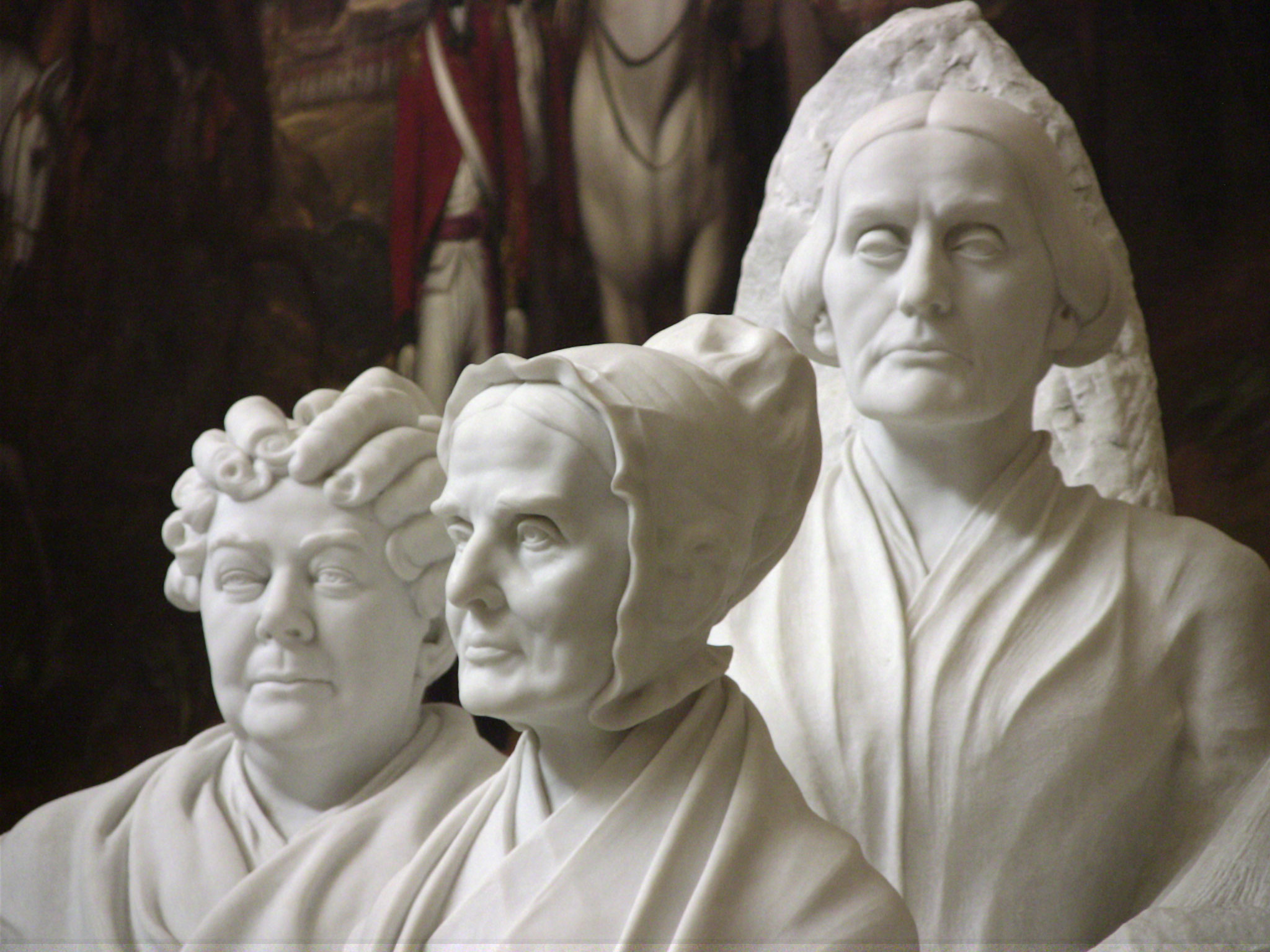
l. to r.: Elizabeth Cady Stanton, Lucretia Mott, Susan B. Anthony

Video 1

Video 2

=== Other statuary and artifacts ===
In addition to the National Statuary Hall Collection and the memorial statuary, there are a number of other pieces in the Rotunda. Next to the south entrance, opposite the statue of George Washington, is a bronze statue of Thomas Jefferson with the Declaration of Independence. Sculpted by David d'Angers, it was donated by Uriah P. Levy and is the only work of art in the Capitol given by a private donor.

At the west entrance, are marble statues of General Ulysses S. Grant and President Abraham Lincoln. The Lincoln statue was a commissioned by Congress and designed by Vinnie Ream. The statue of Grant was sculpted by Franklin Simmons and was a gift to Congress by the Grand Army of the Republic.

== Lying in state and honor ==
Lying in state in the Capitol rotunda

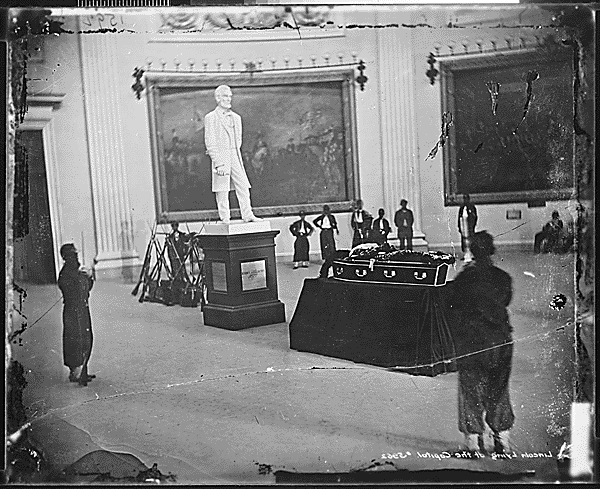
Thaddeus Stevens lying in state on August 13, 1868. The plaster statue of Abraham Lincoln behind the casket is credited to Henry Jackson Ellicott.

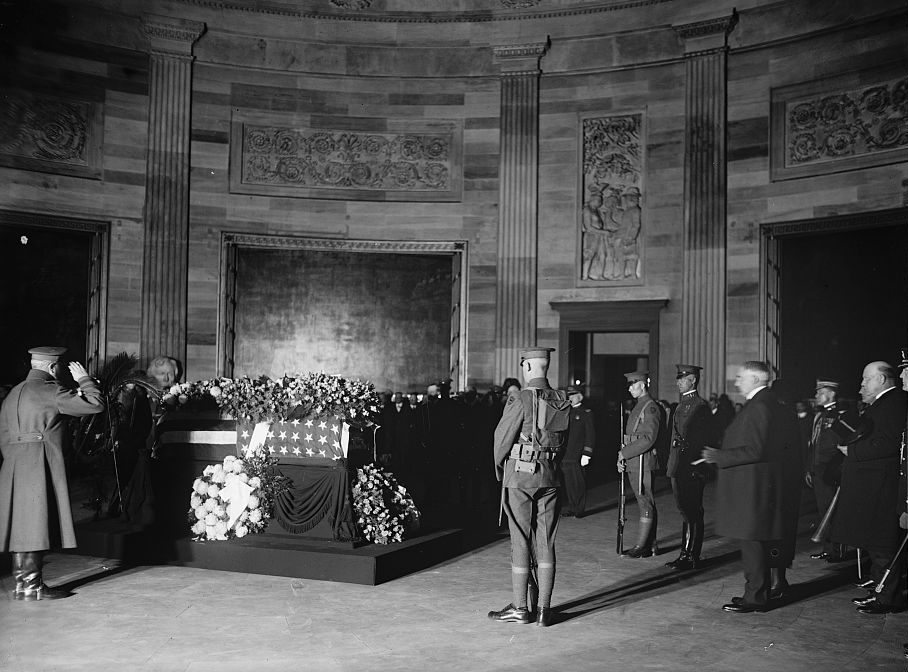
General John J. Pershing saluting the Tomb of the Unknown Soldier of World War I on November 9, 1921.

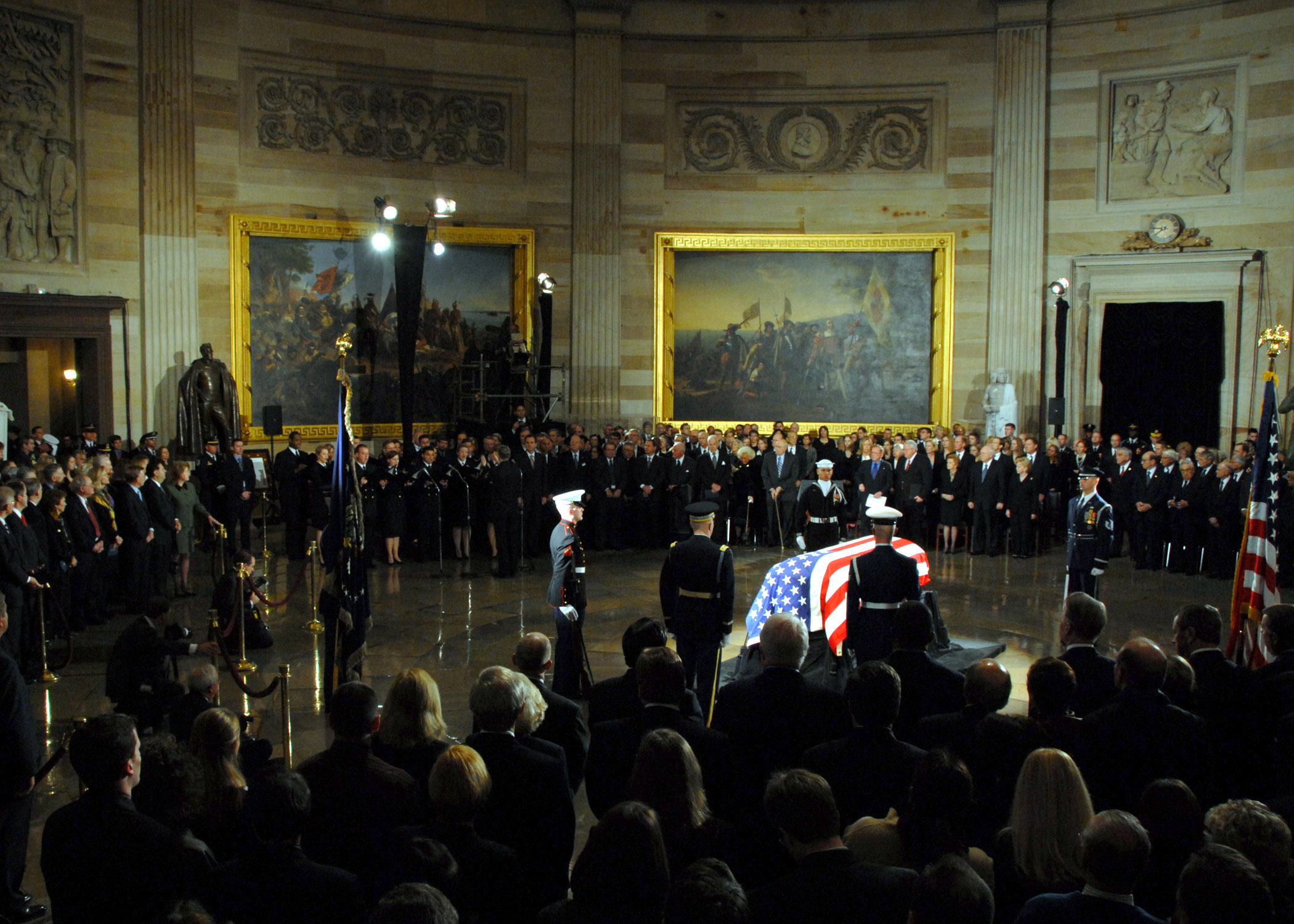
Vice President Dick Cheney and members of Congress view the lying in state of Gerald Ford on December 30, 2006.

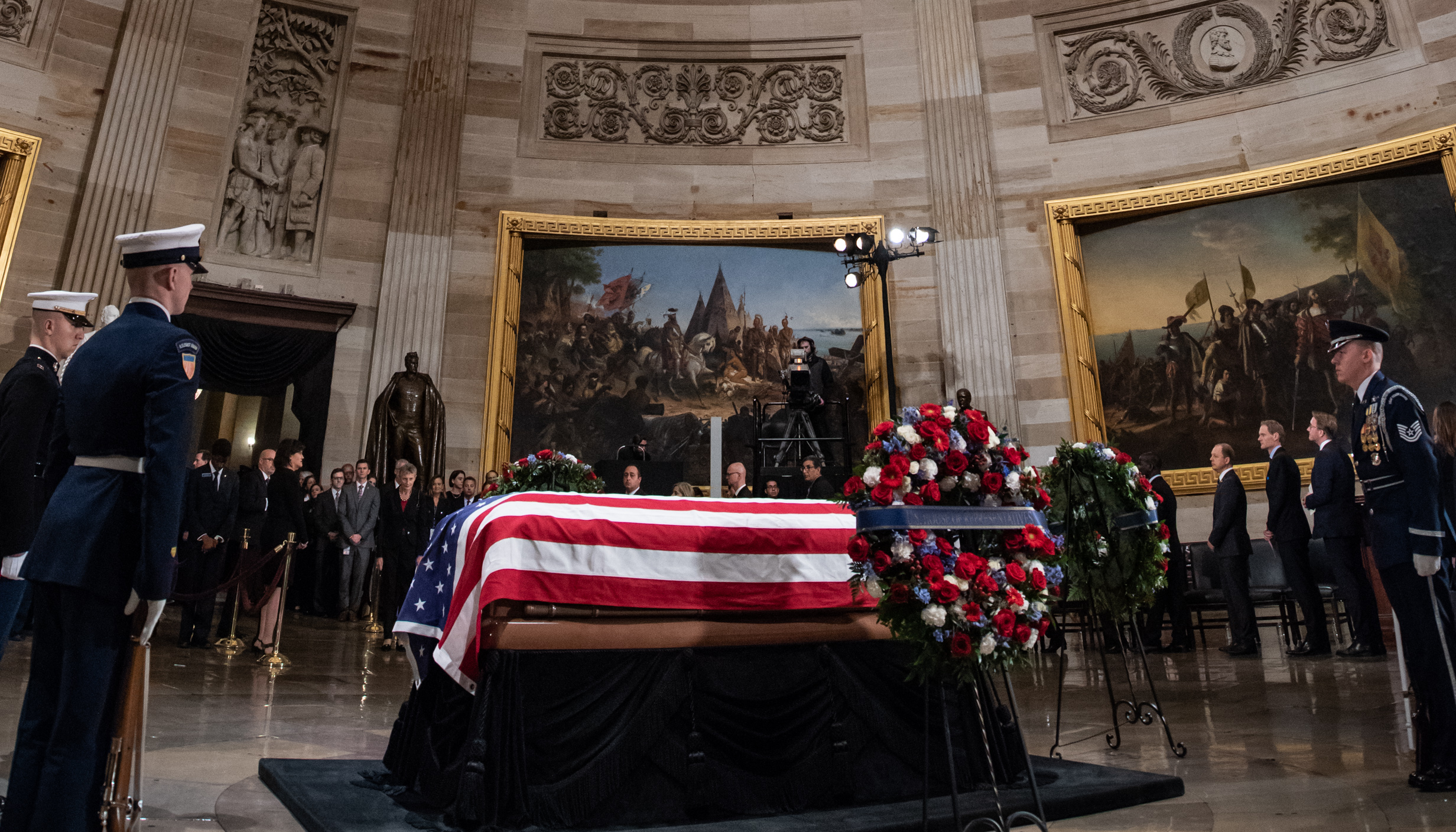
Lying in state of George H. W. Bush in December 2018

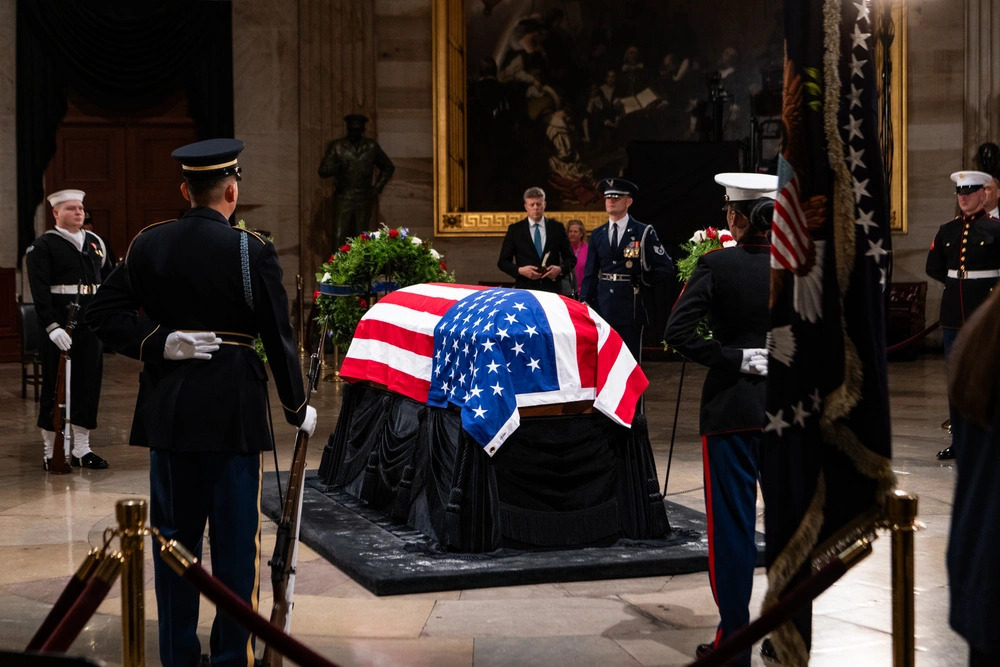
Lying in state of Jimmy Carter in January 2025

The main difference between lying in state and lying in honor is whether the person was an elected official or military officer versus being a private citizen. The designated guard of honor that keeps watch over the casket also differs. When a person lies in state, a guard of honor from the United States Armed Forces watches over the casket; when a person lies in honor, the United States Capitol Police watches as a civilian guard of honor over the casket.

=== Lain in state ===
Government officials and military officers to have lain in state in the Capitol rotunda are as follows:

- Henry Clay (July 1, 1852)
- Abraham Lincoln (April 19–21, 1865)
- Thaddeus Stevens (August 13–14, 1868)
- Charles Sumner (March 13, 1874)
- Henry Wilson (November 25–26, 1875)
- James A. Garfield (September 21–23, 1881)
- John Alexander Logan (December 30–31, 1886)
- William McKinley (September 17, 1901)
- Pierre Charles L'Enfant (April 28, 1909)
- George Dewey (January 20, 1917)
- Unknown Soldier of World War I (November 9–11, 1921)
- Warren G. Harding (August 8, 1923)
- William Howard Taft (March 11, 1930)
- John Joseph Pershing (July 18–19, 1948)
- Robert Alphonso Taft (August 2–3, 1953)
- Unknown Soldiers of World War II and the Korean War (May 28–30, 1958)
- John F. Kennedy (November 24–25, 1963)
- Douglas MacArthur (April 8–9, 1964)
- Herbert Hoover (October 23–25, 1964)
- Dwight D. Eisenhower (March 30–31, 1969)
- Everett McKinley Dirksen (September 9–10, 1969)
- J. Edgar Hoover (May 3–4, 1972)
- Lyndon B. Johnson (January 24–25, 1973)
- Hubert Humphrey (January 14–15, 1978)
- Unknown Soldier of the Vietnam War, later identified as Michael Blassie (May 25–28, 1984)
- Claude Denson Pepper (June 1–2, 1989)
- Ronald Reagan (June 9–11, 2004)
- Gerald Ford (December 30, 2006 – January 2, 2007)
- Daniel Ken Inouye (December 20, 2012)
- John McCain (August 31, 2018)
- George H. W. Bush (December 3–5, 2018)
- John Lewis (July 27–28, 2020)
- Bob Dole (December 9, 2021)
- Harry Reid (January 12, 2022)
- Jimmy Carter (January 7–9, 2025)
- Lindsey Graham (July 28, 2026)

Ruth Bader Ginsburg, Elijah Cummings and Don Young have lain in state on the grounds of the United States Capitol inside of National Statuary Hall.

=== Lain in honor ===
Private citizens to have lain in honor in the United States Capitol Rotunda are as follows:

- Jacob Chestnut and John Gibson (July 28, 1998)
- Rosa Parks (October 30–31, 2005)
- Billy Graham (February 28 – March 1, 2018)
- Brian Sicknick (February 2–3, 2021)
- William Evans (April 13, 2021)
- Hershel W. Williams (July 14, 2022)
- Ralph Puckett (April 29, 2024)

Other notable individuals, several of them being the chief justice of the United States, have lain in state in the United States Supreme Court Building while other individuals such as Ronald H. Brown, have lain in state in the Herbert C. Hoover Building.
