= William Henry Powell (artist) =

American artist (1823–1879)

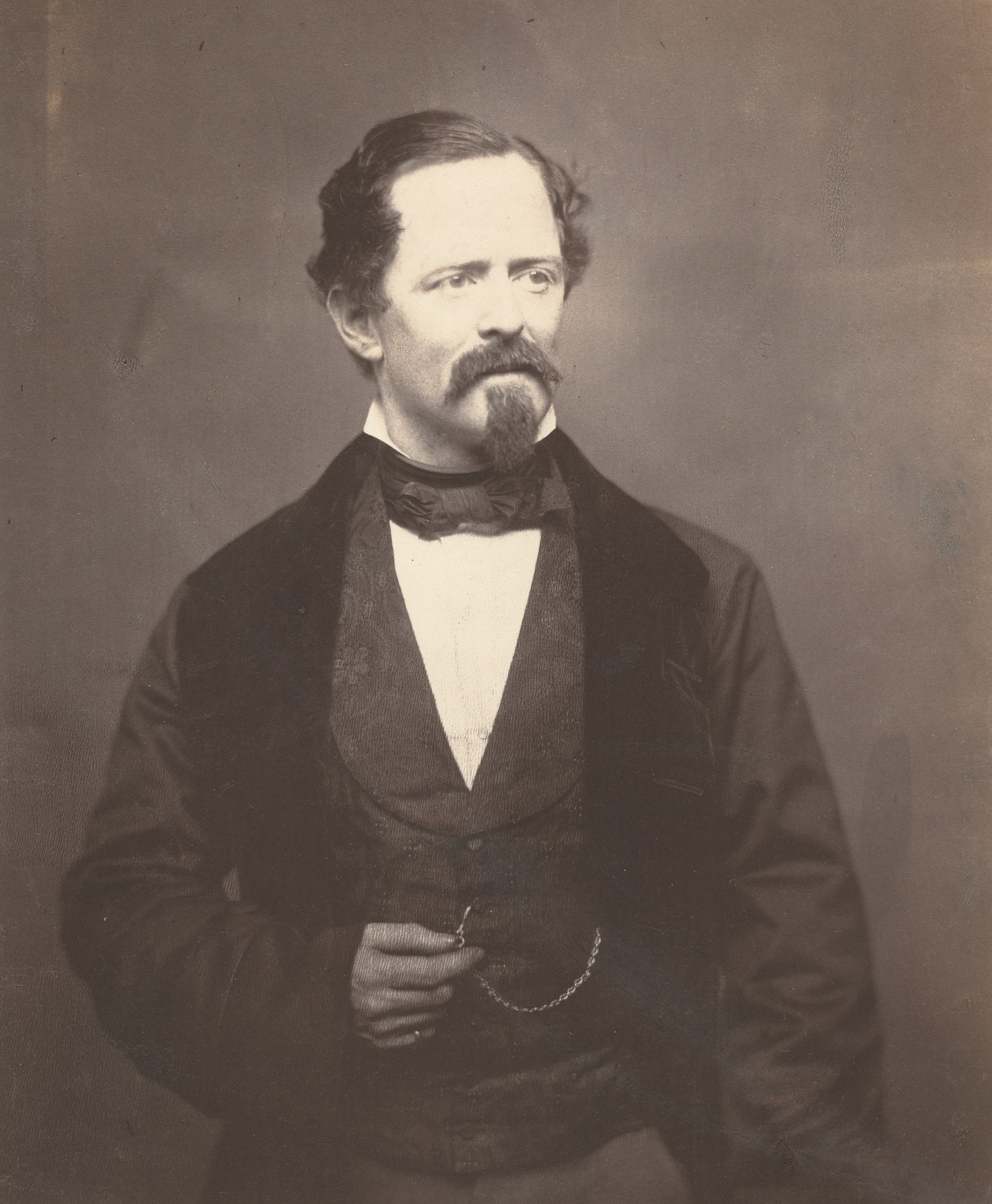
- Powell circa 1850
- Born: February 14, 1823; New York City, New York, U.S.
- Died: October 6, 1879 (aged 56); New York City, New York, U.S.

William Henry Powell (February 14, 1823 – October 6, 1879), was an American artist who was born and died in New York City.

Powell is known for a painting of the Battle of Lake Erie, of which one copy hangs in the Ohio state capitol building and the other, in the United States Capitol. Powell has a second piece of artwork displayed in the United States Capitol Rotunda, the Discovery of the Mississippi by De Soto A.D. 1541.

== Career ==
William Henry Powell studied under artist Henry Inman in New York City prior to receiving a commission from the United States Congress in 1847 to paint the last large historical painting in the Capitol rotunda. Powell selected the discovery of the Mississippi River by Hernando de Soto as the subject of the painting and completed it in 1853. Its positive reception nationwide lead to the Ohio legislature requesting that Powell paint Oliver Hazard Perry's victory in the War of 1812.

The result was the even more popular painting, Perry’s Victory on Lake Erie. The painting was so well received, that in 1865 the United States Congress requested that Powell paint them a copy for one of the stairwells in the north side of the Capitol building. The painting that emerged was created in a temporary studio in Washington, D.C., and larger than the original in Ohio. It was finished in 1873. William Henry Powell died six years later. During his lifetime, Powell was elected into the National Academy of Design.

== Selected works ==
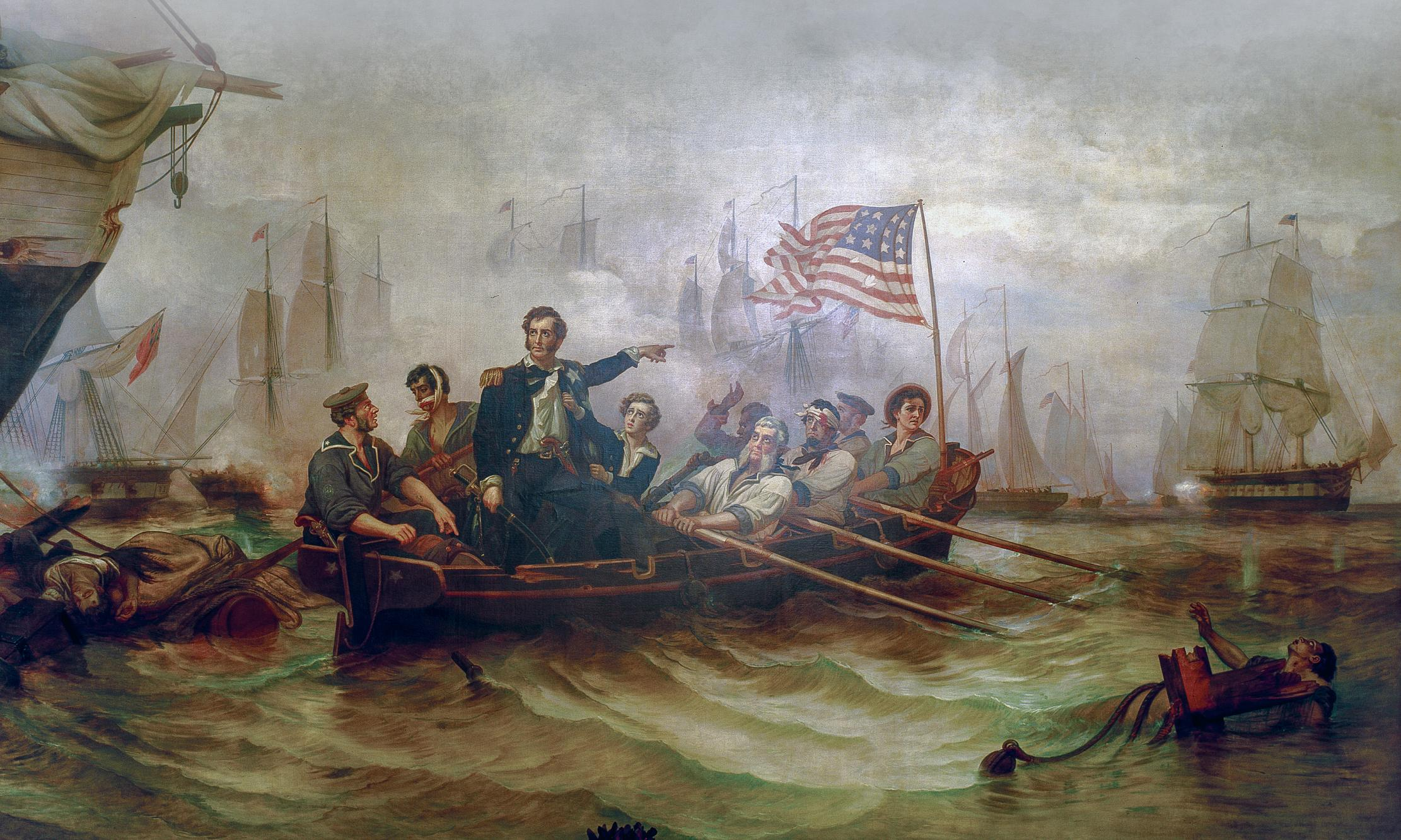
Battle of Lake Erie (1865)

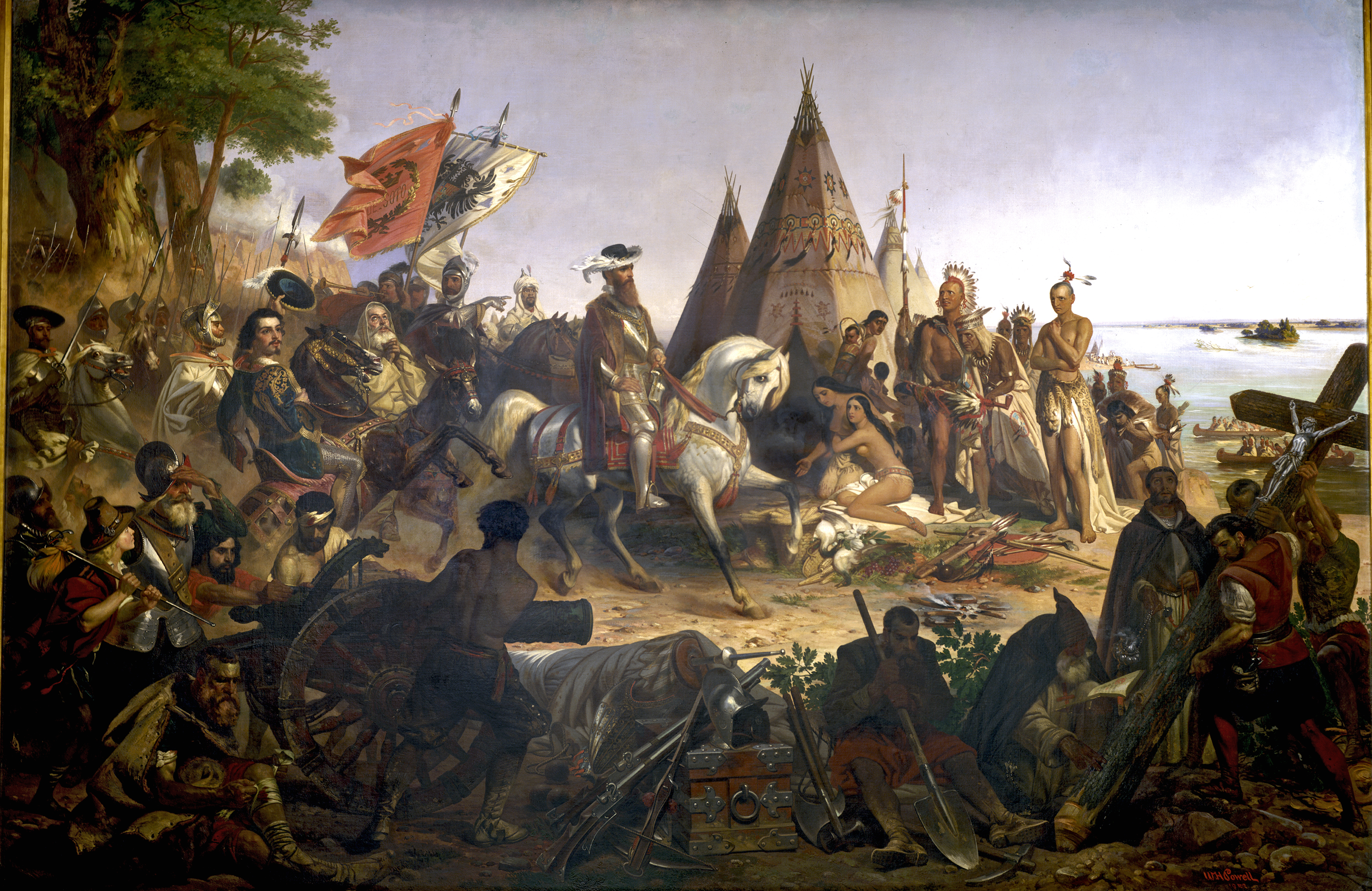
Discovery of the Mississippi by De Soto, 1541 A.D.

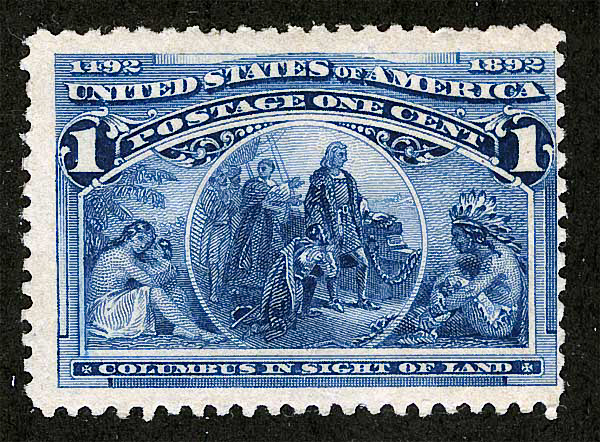
Columbus in Sight of Land. From a painting by William H. Powell

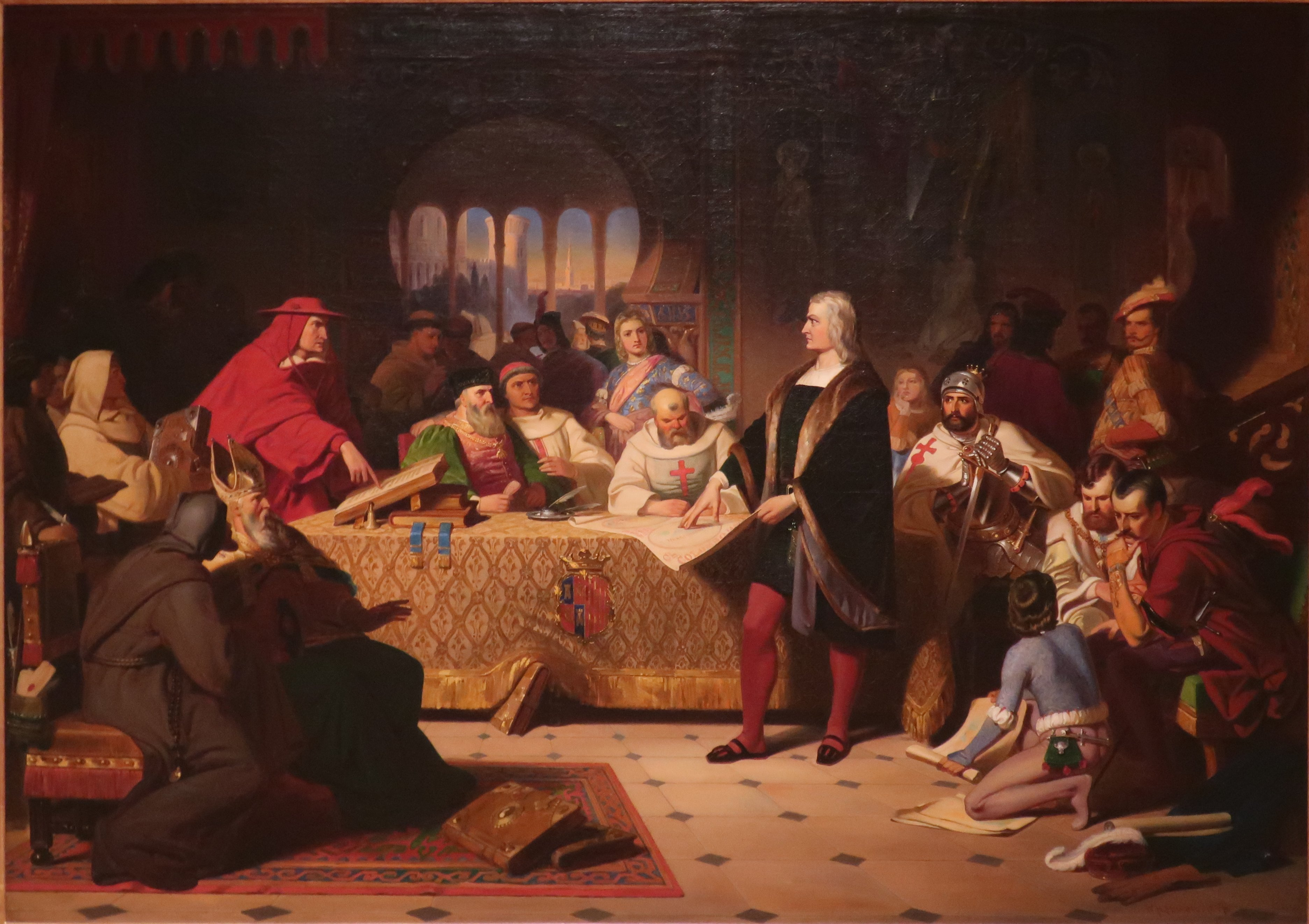
Columbus before the Council of Salamanca, 1847
