= Jimilu Mason =

American sculptor (1930–2019)

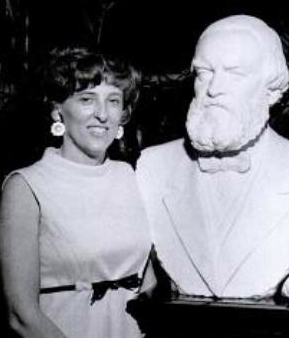
- Jimilu Mason at the dedication of her bust of Constantino Brumidi in 1968
- Born: 1930; Las Cruces, New Mexico, United States
- Died: May 27, 2019; Cincinnati, Ohio, United States
- Education: George Washington University
- Known for: Sculpture
- Spouse: John F. Beary
- Patrons: Lyndon B. Johnson
- Website: jimilustudios.com

Jimilu "Mimi" Mason (or simply known as JIMILU) (1930–2019) was an American sculptor. Mason is known for her busts of notable American figures of the 1960s, including Lyndon B. Johnson, who sat for Mason many times.

== Early life and education ==
Jimilu Mason was born in 1930 in Las Cruces, New Mexico. She was skilled at a young age in modeling and sculpture, which led her to complete a bachelor's degree in fine arts from George Washington University in 1953.

== Career ==
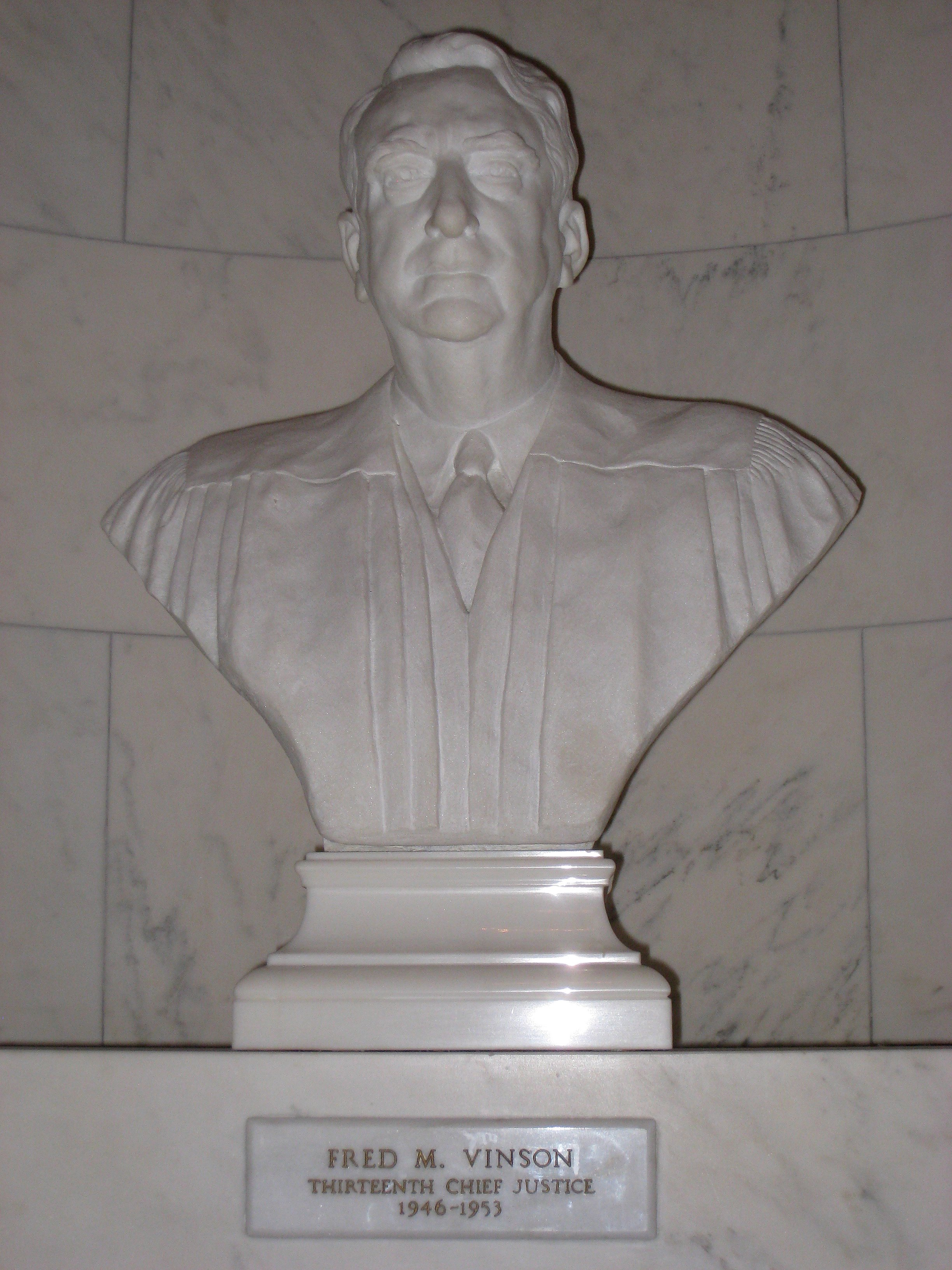
Frederick M. Vinson by Jimilu Mason

Mason lived and worked in Alexandria, Virginia, just outside of Washington D.C., where she operated a frame shop in addition to her studio.

Her breakthrough work was when she submitted a bust of Frederick M. Vinson for consideration during a call for submissions for the chief justice's official portrait. Mason's bust was chosen. Today, it resides in the Supreme Court Bust Collection.

Her sculpture of Constantino Brumidi is located in the Brumidi Corridors. She was friends with Roger L. Stevens, who sat for Mason. Her bust of Stevens is on display at the Kennedy Center, of which he was founding chair. Mason also created works of Audie Murphy, Edwin C. Johnson, and Sam Rayburn.

In 1971, Mason was awarded the Outstanding Alumnus Award from George Washington University.

Mason's final piece was a memorial to 9/11.

=== Lyndon B. Johnson ===
She sculpted numerous busts of Lyndon Johnson. Johnson sat for Mason, at both his ranch and at the White House. Johnson would call Mason and invite her down to his ranch, having her fly with him on Air Force One with the work-in-progress. She preferred to work with Johnson at his ranch, where he was more relaxed. One of her bust's of Johnson resides in the Vice Presidential Bust Collection and another is on display at the Lyndon B. Johnson Library. Johnson appointment Mason to serve on the board of the National Council of the Arts from 1966 until 1972.

=== Style ===
Mason created her sculptures out of clay. Final pieces were cast in bronze or chiseled in Carrara marble.

== Later life and legacy ==
Mason died at the Seasons Retirement Community in Cincinnati, Ohio on May 27, 2019.

== Notable works ==
- 1963: Lyndon B. Johnson, National Portrait Gallery, Washington, D.C.
- 1967: Constantino Brumidi, United States Senate, Washington, D.C.
- 1970: Samuel Taliaferro Rayburn, National Portrait Gallery, Washington, D.C.
- 1986: The Servant Christ, Christ House, Washington, D.C.
- 1990: The Parable, The Festival Center, Washington, D.C.
