= Brumidi Corridors =

Vaulted, decorated corridors in the United States Capitol

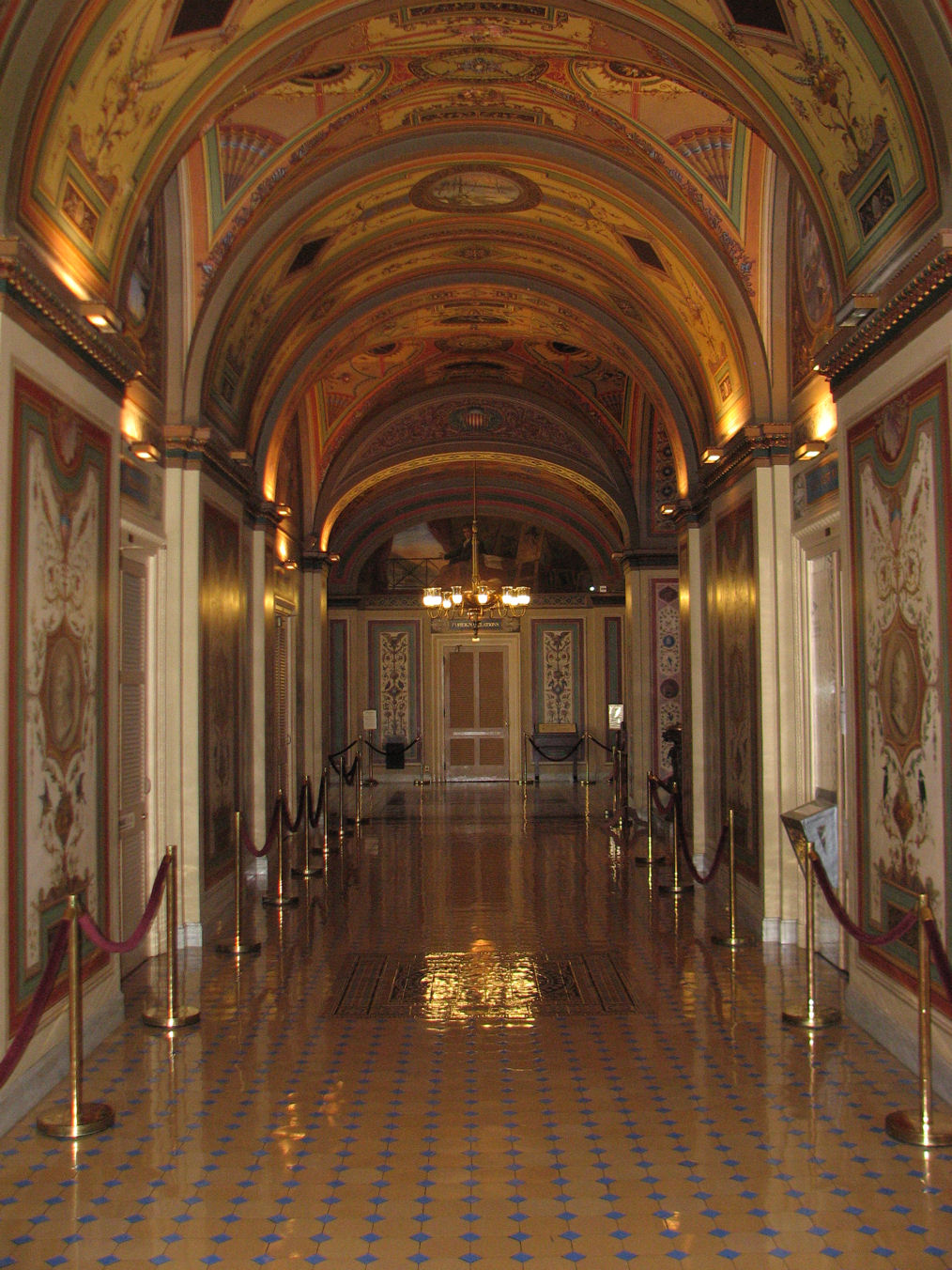
Brumidi Corridors facing east towards Patent Lobby (2007)

The Brumidi Corridors are the vaulted, ornately decorated corridors on the first floor of the Senate wing in the United States Capitol.

== Background and artist ==
They are named for Constantino Brumidi, who designed the murals, although assistants and other artists are responsible for many of the details. Brumidi was an Italian artist of Greek descent who was born in Rome in 1805. He studied at the Academy of St. Luke in Rome and worked for three years in the Vatican under Pope Gregory XVI, and served several aristocrats as an artist for palaces and villas, including the prince Torlonia. Brumidi emigrated to the United States in 1852, and, after proving his skill in frescos 1855, he spent much of the next 25 years until his death in 1880 working in the Capitol, painting the frieze of American history and The Apotheosis of Washington in the Rotunda as well as the Brumidi Corridors.

== Construction and design ==
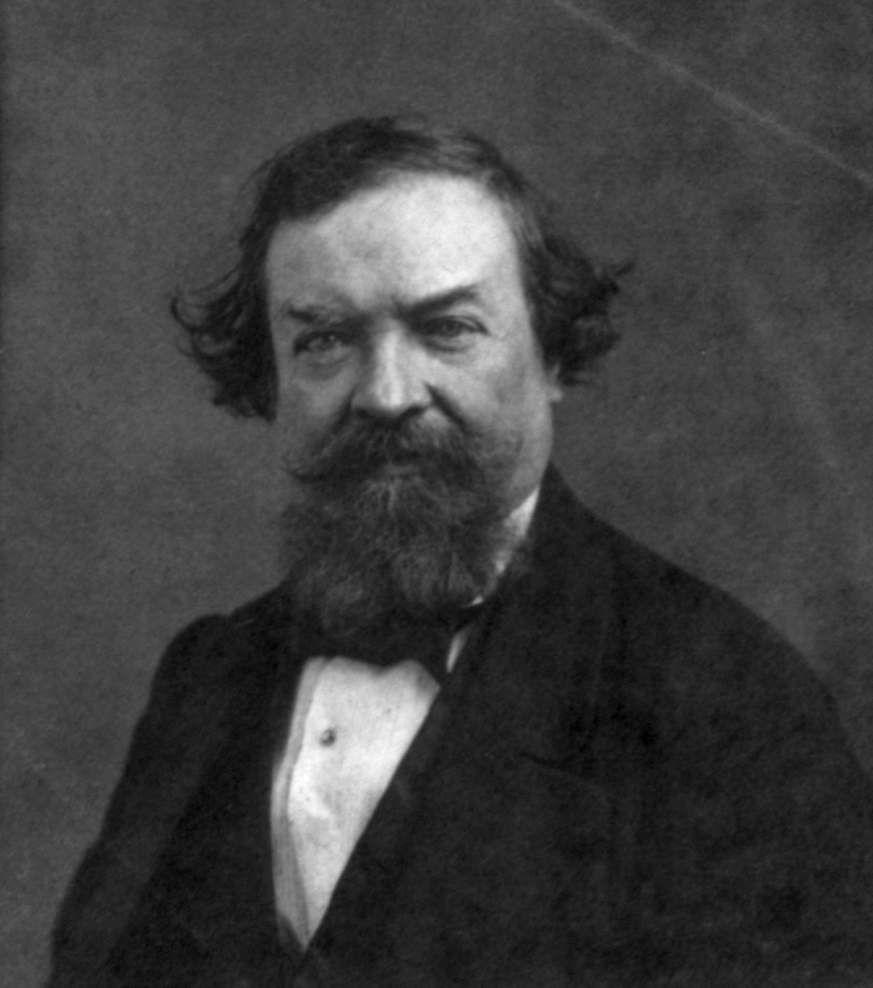
Constantino Brumidi

The Brumidi Corridors were part of the new wing constructed under Architect of the Capitol Thomas U. Walter between 1852 and 1859. Brumidi began making designs for the corridors in 1856. The decorative painting of the walls and ceilings of the main corridors was carried out primarily between 1857 and 1859. Brumidi added details in the 1860s and frescoed the lunettes over the doorways in the 1870s. Although Walter had envisioned plain-colored walls hung with oil paintings, Captain Montgomery C. Meigs, Superintendent of Construction, directed Brumidi to carry out an elaborate decorative scheme based on Raphael's Loggia in the Vatican. Brumidi's classical training in Rome gave him a thorough understanding of ancient Roman, Renaissance, and Baroque styles, symbols, and techniques of wall painting.

Brumidi created the overall design for the corridors and directed its execution by artists of many nationalities. His immediate assistants included Joseph Rakemann, Albert Peruchi, and Ludwig Odense. An English artist, James Leslie, painted parts of the walls and ceilings of the corridors, including some of the birds and animals copied from specimens borrowed from the Smithsonian Institution. Leslie also probably painted the trophies of musical, marine, agricultural, and military implements at the intersection of the north and west corridors and possibly the monochrome lunettes of trophies near the refectory. The foreman of the decorative painters was Emmerich Carstens.

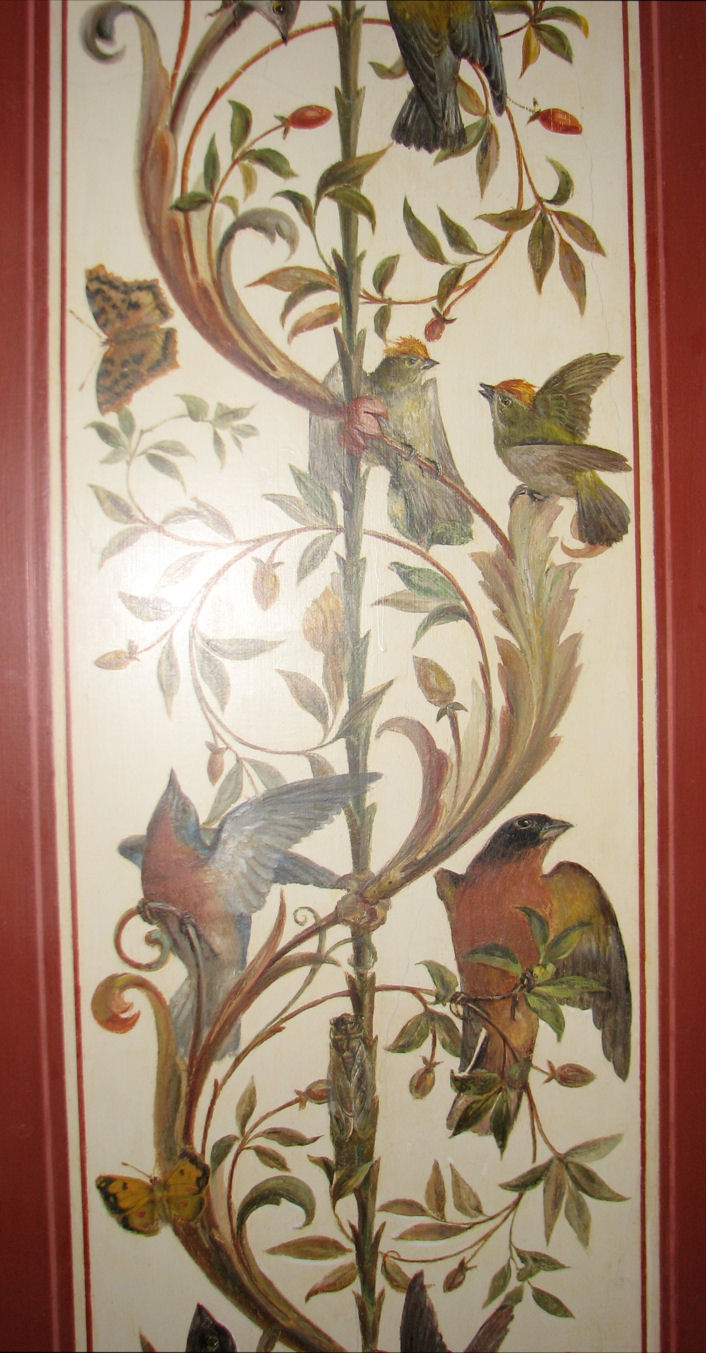
Detail of song birds and butterflies in Brumidi Corridor.

A variety of techniques were employed in the corridors. Brumidi created the portraits and historical or allegorical scenes in the semicircular lunettes over the doorways in the difficult true fresco technique. The wall decorations were painted by decorative painters in lime-wash fresco; Brumidi himself probably painted the portraits. The ceilings were painted in water-soluble tempera, which was then called "distemper." Within the framework of panels framed by illusionistic moldings are symmetrical designs of scrolling vines, vases, and mythological figures. Into these classical motifs Brumidi integrated American flora and fauna. On the intricately decorated walls can be seen an amazing variety of classical gods and goddesses; birds of a hundred different species; rodents, including chipmunks, squirrels, and mice; insects and reptiles; and flowers and fruits. On the ceilings are landscapes and agricultural implements interspersed among the colorful framework of ornament. The painters of the scenic landscapes and the impressionist-style oval landscapes in the ceiling are not documented.

The subjects of Brumidi's lunettes over the doorways reflect the functions of the committees that met in the rooms between 1873 and 1878 when they were painted. At the end of the west corridor, over the door to S-131, is Authority Consults the Written Law (39k), whose subject related to the Senate Committee on the Revision of Laws assigned to the room. Columbus and the Indian Maiden (41k) and Bartolomé de Las Casas (40k), who was called the "Apostle of the Indians," were painted over the doors of the Senate Committee on Indian Affairs (S-132 and S-133). Above the present Senate Appropriations Committee room (S-128), originally occupied by the Military Affairs Committee, is Bellona, the Roman war-goddess (58k). In the ceiling at the north end of the corridor the signs of the Zodiac appear on fields of blue. Along the walls, Brumidi painted monochrome profile portraits of famous early Americans (John Hancock, Francis Hopkinson, Robert Livingston, Roger Sherman, John Jay, Charles Thomson, Charles Carroll of Carrollton, and Robert Morris) set in medallions to resemble reliefs carved in stone.

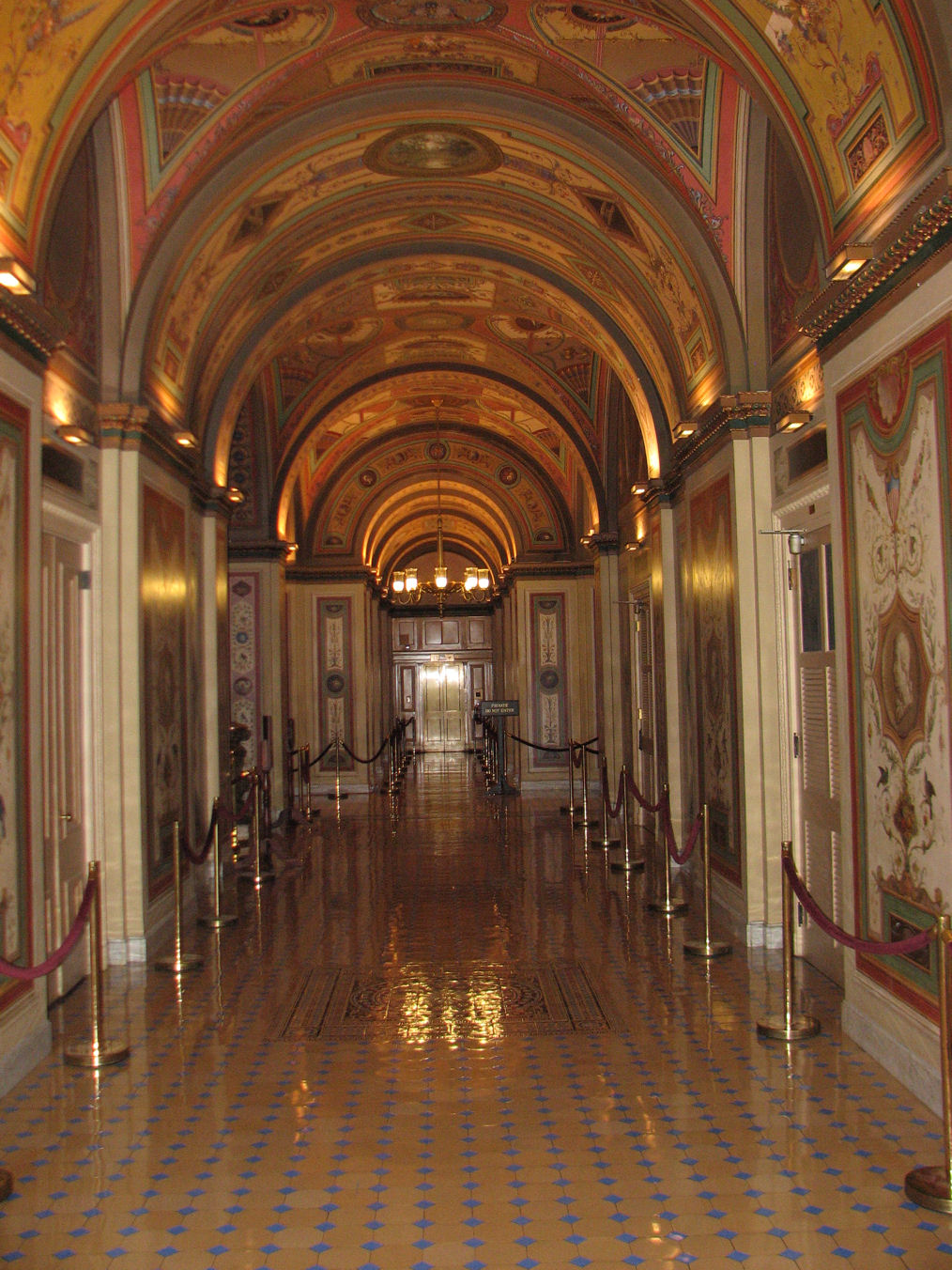
Brumidi Corridor facing west.

Decorations in the north corridor include colorful parrots and trophies on the walls near the elevator. Near the stairways at either end of the corridor are pilasters decorated with squirrels and mice. Monochrome medallion portraits of Revolutionary War leaders (Daniel Morgan, Jonathan Trumbull, Horatio Gates, Israel Putnam, Thomas Mifflin, Silas Deane, Richard Montgomery, Joseph Warren, Thomas Jefferson, and Benjamin Franklin) are painted along the walls. Modern inventions, such as the airplane, were painted on the ceiling in the early twentieth century. Over S-124, which was then used by the Senate Committee on Territories, Brumidi painted The Cession of Louisiana (45k), depicting the meeting of Robert Livingston, James Monroe, and the François Barbé-Marbois in 1803. In this area a bronze bust of Cordell Hull and a marble one of Constantino Brumidi by Jimilu Mason, dedicated in 1967, are displayed.

The north entrance retains its original tempera ceiling painted by Emmerich Carstens in 1875; Brumidi painted the frescoed portraits of jurists Justice Joseph Story and Chancellor James Kent, and the imitation sculpture bust of Chancellor Robert R. Livingston, in 1878. The area below is decorated with birds; medallions hold scenes of animals and landscapes. The profile portraits of Andrew Jackson, Henry Clay, Daniel Webster, and an Adams, perhaps John Quincy Adams, are different in style and inferior in quality; they are thought to date from the turn of the century. Opposite the entry is a painting of the USS Constitution copied from a 1924 lithograph.

At the east end of the north corridor, over S-118, then occupied by the Senate Committee on Foreign Relations, Brumidi painted The Signing of the First Treaty of Peace with Great Britain (44k). His depiction of the 1782 event shows John Adams, Benjamin Franklin, John Jay, Henry Laurens, and the British representative Richard Oswald and was based on an unfinished sketch by Benjamin West. On the ceiling plows and other agricultural implements are depicted.

The Committee on Patents occupied the room on the east end of the north corridor, now S-116. For the area known as the Patent Corridor, Brumidi created frescoed lunettes with three important inventors: John Fitch (47k) (working on his steamboat model), Benjamin Franklin (40k), and Robert Fulton (18k). (Appropriately, Franklin appears over the door of the room then assigned to the Committee on Post Offices and Post Roads.) On the ceiling are trophies of the arts and sciences. In this area a bronze bust of Cordell Hull and a marble one of Constantino Brumidi by Jimilu Mason, dedicated in 1967, are displayed.

Along the main north–south corridor are 14 oval medallions of landscapes, probably by one of the German decorative painters. In the south corridor eight medallions of animal groups alternate with repeated red, white, and blue shields. In the area leading to the refectory is an original tempera ceiling with illusionistic carved eagles and coffers and trophies of military equipment.

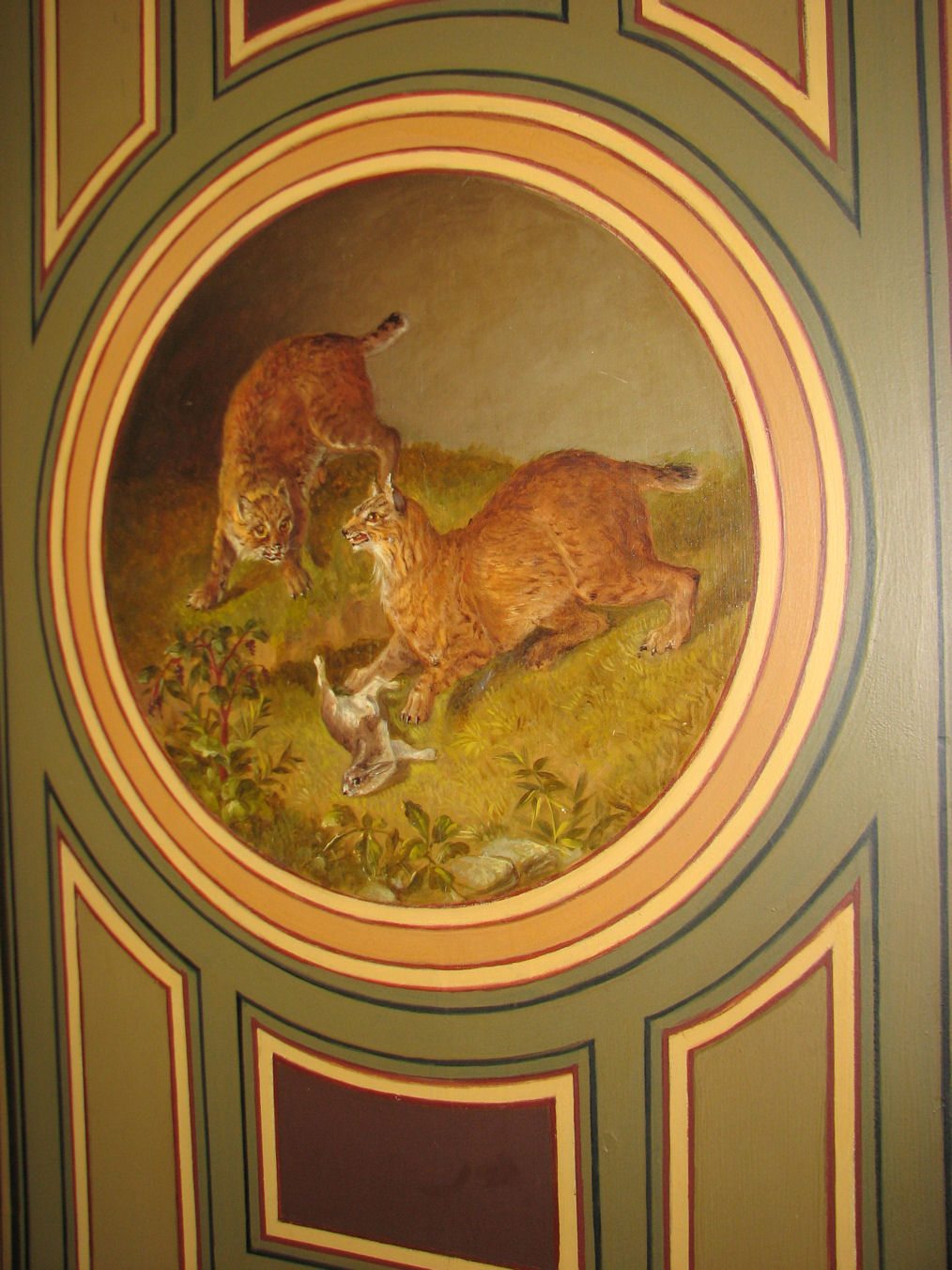
Detail of two bobcats in the Brumidi Corridors.

Visitors to the Capitol have long been puzzled by the many blank ovals in the corridors. Although intended for pictures, these were left empty when the corridors were being painted in 1858 and 1859 because of restrictions by Congress, which was considering having all fine art in the Capitol approved by an art commission. In the 1870s, Brumidi was hired to paint scenes in many of the empty spaces, but his progress was limited by lack of time and funds.

Some of the blank areas in the north corridor have been filled by later artists. Around 1930, an unknown artist portrayed the Wright Flyer, the Wright Brothers' airplane, and Charles Lindbergh's Spirit of St. Louis. In 1975, Allyn Cox depicted the Moon landing. The most recent addition to the corridor is the scene depicting the Space Shuttle Challenger mission crew, painted by Charles Schmidt in 1987. These last two scenes were painted on canvas and then applied to the wall.

The Brumidi Corridors have always been a high-traffic area and, thus, vulnerable to damage; they were first repaired by Brumidi as early as 1861. In 1897, the backgrounds of the wall decorations were completely repainted in oil by William H. Duckstein. Aside from constant repainting, the walls were protected with varnish, which discolors over time, so that gradually the backgrounds turned from creamy white to yellow and the borders from sandstone color to murky green. Brumidi's frescoes were also painted over in oil paint when they became damaged or dark with grime. Major campaigns of retouching and repainting in oil over the frescoes were carried out by Charles Ayer Whipple (from 1919 to 1927), Charles Moberly (from 1921 to 1931), and George B. Matthews (between 1928 and 1935). In some cases, these "restorers" proudly signed and dated their work, which included changing costumes and colors and adding their own details over Brumidi's composition. In the 1950s the walls were retouched and the ceilings repainted under Francis Cumberland and Joseph Giacolone and his sons. Cliff Young also restored the signs of the zodiac in 1980.

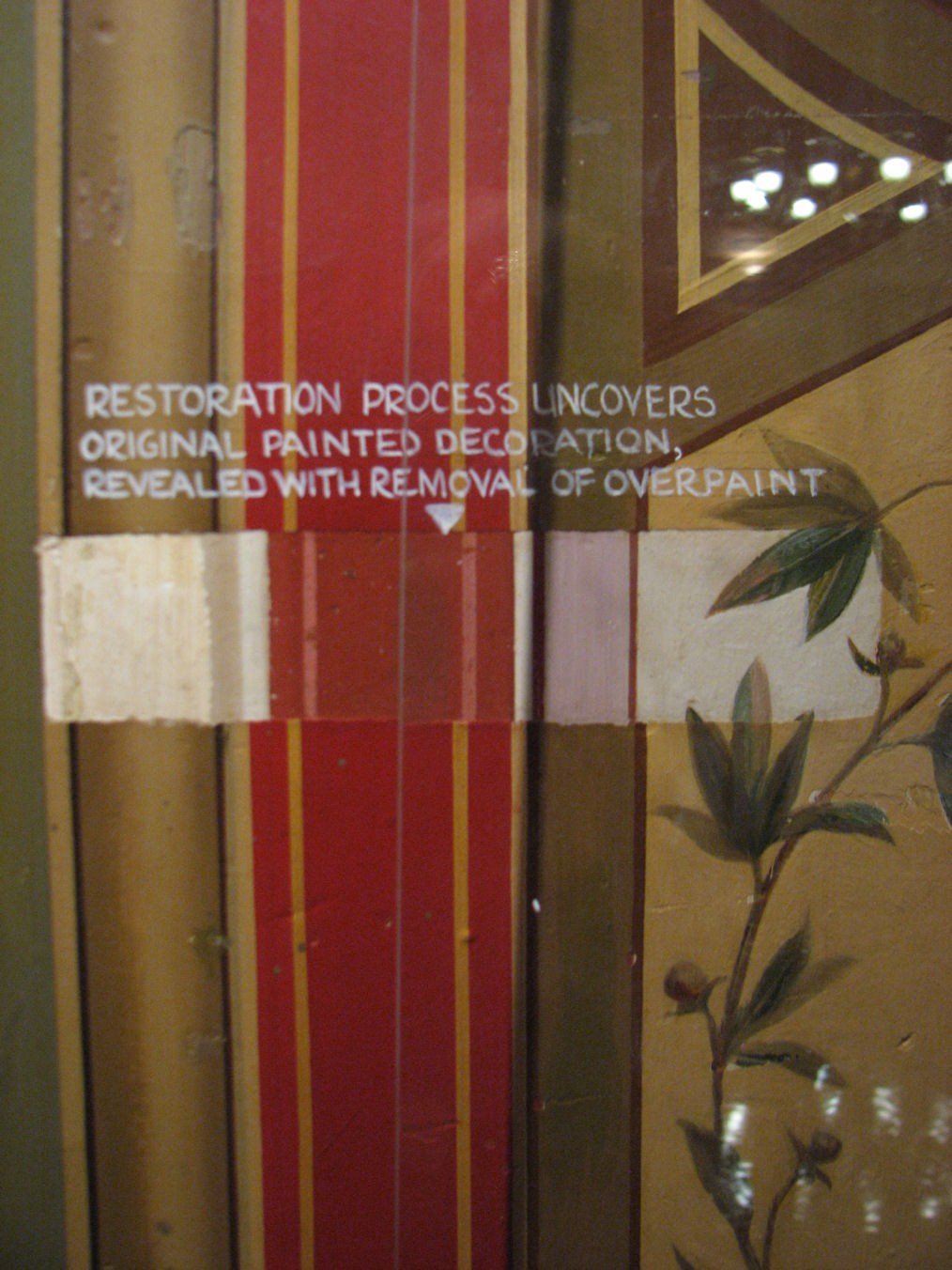
Detail from restoration display in the Brumidi Corridors.

Between 1985 and 1995, Brumidi's frescoes were cleaned and conserved by professional conservators, including Bernard Rabin, Constance Silver, Catherine Myers, and Christiana Cunningham-Adams, to reveal his original compositions. Following careful study, the walls of the corridors are being gradually restored to their original colors and details. The pilot phase began in 1996. By 1999, the walls in the Patent Corridor were brought back to their 1850s appearance. Unstable plaster was consolidated to make it firm, layers of overpaint were painstakingly removed, mainly with sharp scalpels, and missing details were inpainted. Although a clear protective coating is being applied to the restored murals, they are extremely vulnerable to damage, and care must be taken to make sure that they are not touched or bumped. The plain sandstone-colored borders and illusionistic shadows around the panels are being replicated to match small uncovered areas of the original. Conservation of the murals continues in the north corridor. No two panels are exactly alike, and new details and delicate colors are coming to light as the murky overpaint is removed.

The ornate bronze railing of the stairways used by senators at either end of the north corridor are composed of cherubs, eagles, and deer entwined in leafy rinceaux that echo the wall decoration. They were designed by Brumidi, sculpted by Edmond Baudin, and cast in Philadelphia by Archer, Warner, Miskey & Co. in 1858 and 1859. Cleaning and conservation in 1988 have restored their original antique bronze patina.

The ornately patterned and colored tile floors were manufactured by Minton, Hollins & Company in England. They were installed throughout the new extensions between 1856 and 1861. The encaustic tile, made of inlaid colored clays, was chosen for its beauty, durability, and rich design, which complement the painted decoration of the corridors.
