= United States Capitol dome =

Dome above the rotunda of the US Capitol

Coordinates: 38°53′24″N 77°0′32.4″W

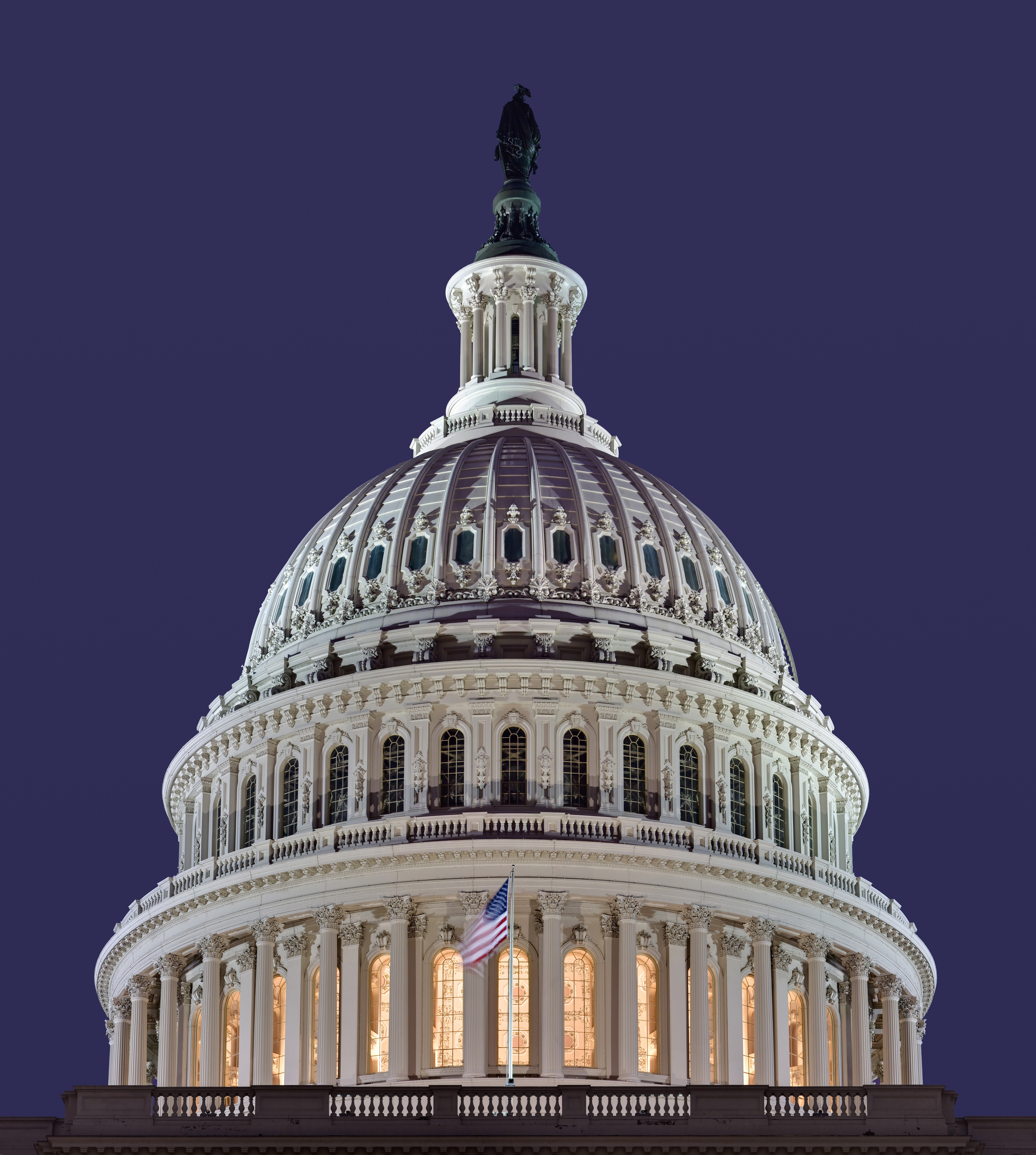
The dome of the United States Capitol building at night in 2006, topped by the Statue of Freedom

The United States Capitol features a dome situated above its rotunda. The dome is 288 feet (88 m) in height and 96 feet (29 m) in diameter. Designed by Thomas U. Walter, the fourth Architect of the Capitol, it was constructed between 1855 and 1866 at a cost of $1,047,291 (equivalent to $18.1 million in 2025). The Statue of Freedom tops the lantern on the dome, and the dome is centered over the origin on street maps of Washington, D.C.

The dome is not stone, but rather cast iron carefully painted to appear to be made of the same stone as the capitol building below. It is actually two domes, one inside the other, and the total weight is 9.1 million pounds (4,100 t). The dome's cast iron frame was supplied and constructed by the iron foundry Janes, Fowler, Kirtland & Co. in the Bronx, New York. The interior of the dome includes a detailed geometric and floral pattern of lightly colored plasterwork, with Constantino Brumidi's monumental ceiling fresco, The Apotheosis of Washington, appearing in the oculus at the top of the inner dome.

== First dome (1823–1855) ==
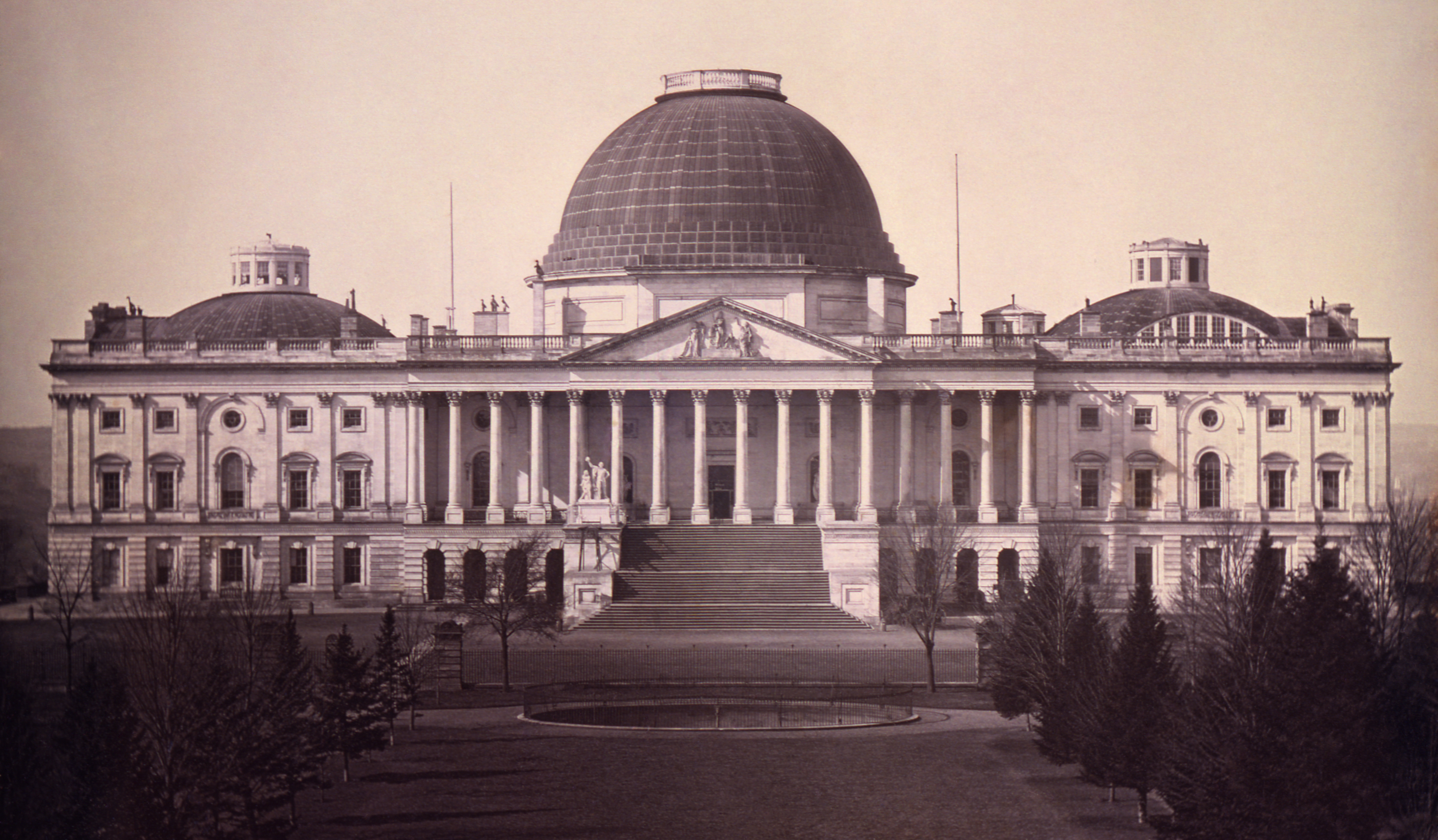
The United States Capitol in 1846 following the addition of Charles Bulfinch's dome

The origin of the first dome began with the Capitol design contest sponsored by Secretary of State Thomas Jefferson, at the behest of President George Washington, in 1792. The winner of the contest, Doctor William Thornton, called for a dome in his original design for the building. Most vividly, Thornton drew upon the Roman Pantheon for inspiration with the Neoclassical dome and associated portico.

Thornton's replacement, Benjamin Henry Latrobe, the second Architect of the Capitol, altered Thornton's design plan on the exterior by adding an octagonal drum to visually separate the bottom of the dome from the top of the building's pediment. The third Architect of the Capitol, Charles Bulfinch, altered the exterior profile of the plans still further by increasing the dome's height, which he later wrote was at the insistence of the President and Congress.

In 1822, Bulfinch requested funds for the construction of the center of the building, and President James Monroe signed off on an appropriation of $120,000. This included the building of a double-dome structure, a stone, brick, and wooden interior dome to rise 96 feet (29 m) above the rotunda floor (matching the dimensions of the Pantheon), and a wooden exterior dome covered in copper that would rise to 140 feet (43 m). Set at the crown of the exterior dome was an oculus 24 feet (7.3 m) wide, which provided illumination to the rotunda floor below. Bulfinch completed the project in 1823.

For more than two decades, the green copper dome of the Capitol greeted visitors to the nation's capital, until the 1850s. Due to the growth of the United States and the expansion and addition of new states, the size of the U.S. Congress had grown accordingly and pushed the limits of the capacity of the Capitol. Under the guidance of the fourth Architect of the Capitol, Thomas U. Walter, extensions were built onto the north and south wings of the building. In the process, the new, longer building made the original Bulfinch dome appear aesthetically displeasing (and it had in any case been the object of much prior criticism). Congress, after lobbying by Walter and Montgomery C. Meigs, then the supervising engineer, passed legislation to build a bigger dome in 1855.

== Second dome (1866–present) ==
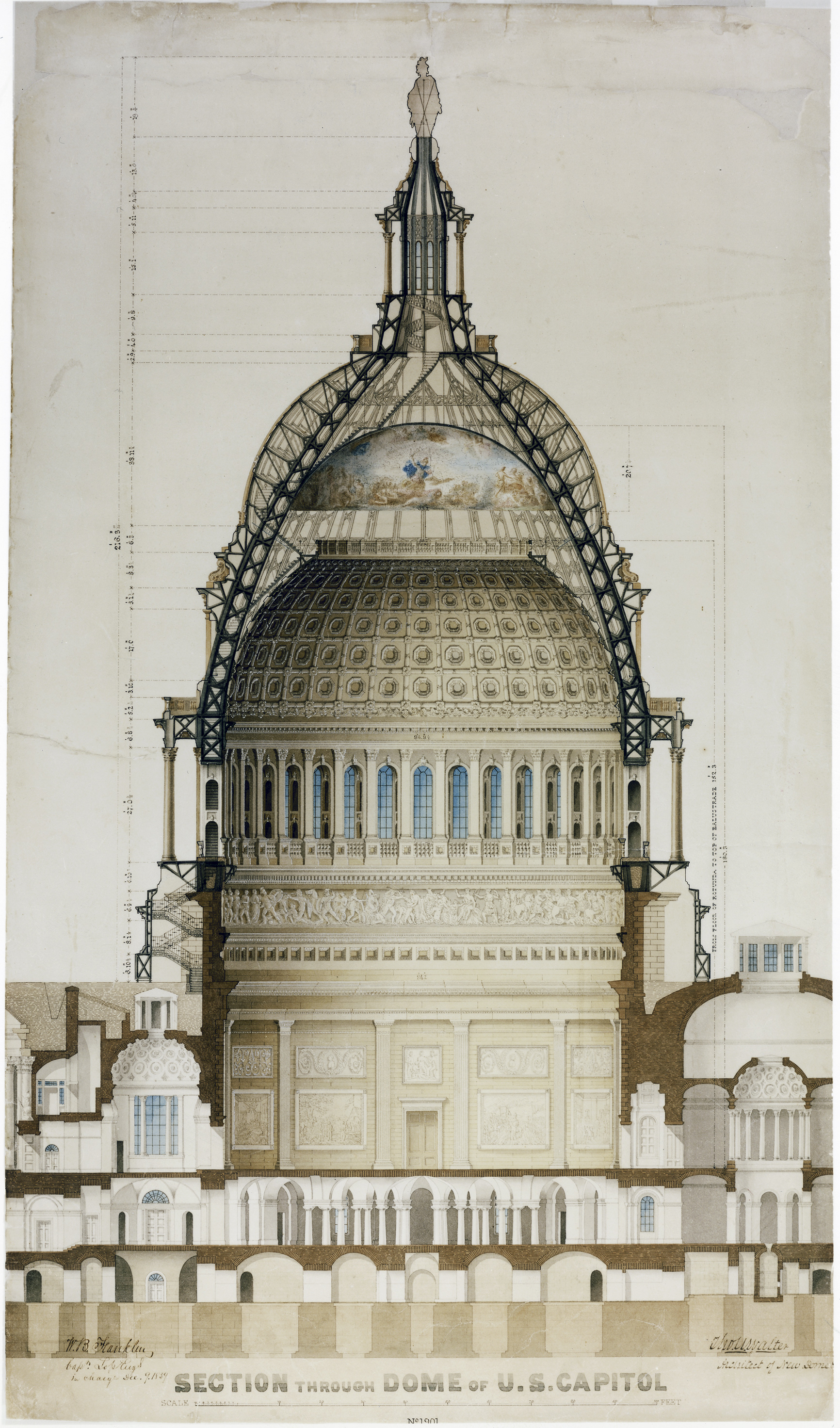
An 1859 cross-section drawing of the dome and its supporting structure by Thomas Ustick Walter

The current cast iron dome of the United States Capitol is the second dome to sit above the building. Plans began in May 1854 to build a new cast-iron dome for the United States Capitol, sold on the aesthetics of a new dome, as well as the utility of a fire-proof one. Influenced by the great domes of Europe, Walter paid particular attention to the Pantheon of Paris, St Paul's Cathedral in London and St. Peter's Basilica in Rome, as well as the more recent Saint Isaac's Cathedral in Saint Petersburg, Russia, one of the first domes with an iron frame, by Auguste de Montferrand (1786–1858). William Allen, Historian of the Capitol, described Walter's first design as

... a tall, ellipsoidal dome standing on a two-story drum with a ring of forty columns forming a peristyle surrounding the lower half of the drum. The upper part of the drum was enriched with decorated pilasters upholding a bracketed attic. Crowning the composition was a statue standing on a slender, columned tholus ...

Walter drafted a seven-foot (2.1 m) drawing of the aforementioned design and displayed it in his office, where it drew the excited attention of members of Congress in 1854. A year later, on March 3, 1855, President Franklin Pierce signed off on the appropriation of $100,000 (equivalent to $2.73 million in 2025) to build the dome. Construction began after some practical changes to the original design (such as the reduction of the columns from 40 to 36) in September of that year with the removal of the dome raised by Charles Bulfinch. A unique scaffold was built inside the rotunda, designed to keep weight away from the weak center area of the floor, and a crane was set within to run on a steam-powered engine (fueled from the salvaged wood from the old dome).

The March 4, 1861 inauguration of Abraham Lincoln with the unfinished capitol dome visible

Over the next 11 years, the dome designed with an interior dome and exterior dome rose over the nation's capitol. By December 2, 1863, Walter was able to set the Statue of Freedom atop the dome. This was not accomplished until after Walter had been forced to revise the design of the dome to handle the statue, which had been delivered taller and heavier than requested. Yet, the man who designed the dome did not see its total completion, because Thomas Walter resigned in 1865. His replacement, Edward Clark, assumed the role of finishing the last aspects of the dome. Just over a month later, in January 1866, Constantino Brumidi—who had been hired to paint a fresco on a platform above the interior dome's oculus—removed the scaffolding used during his work on the Apotheosis of Washington. This signaled the end of construction for the United States Capitol dome.

Some 8,909,200 pounds (4,041.1 t) of iron were ultimately used in the construction that ran virtually 11 years. Inside, the interior dome rises to 180 feet (55 m) over the rotunda floor, and outside, the exterior dome ascends to 288 feet (88 m) including the height of the Statue of Freedom. The total cost of the dome was valued at $1,047,291 (equivalent to $18.1 million in 2025).

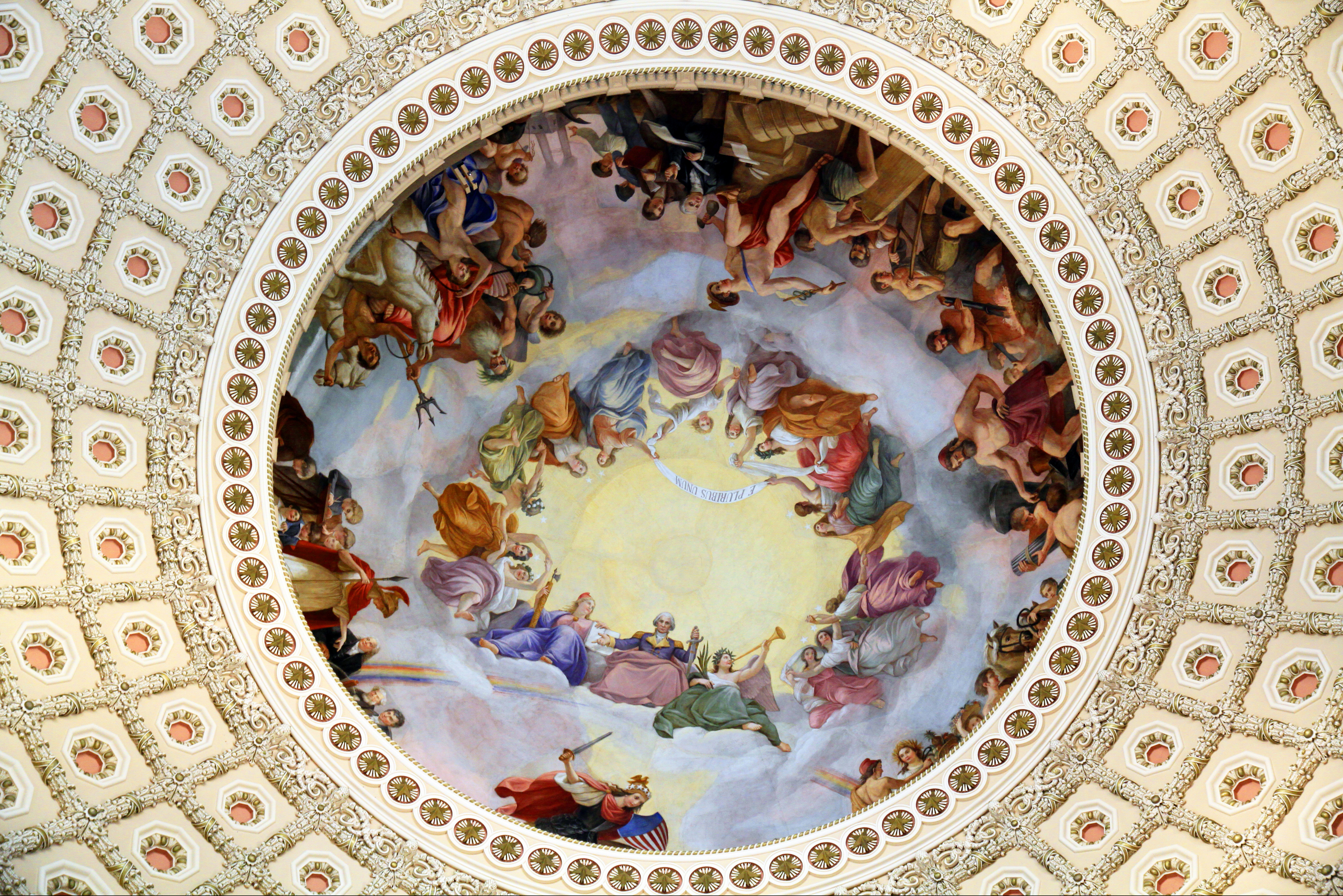
The Apotheosis of Washington, an 1865 fresco by Constantino Brumidi

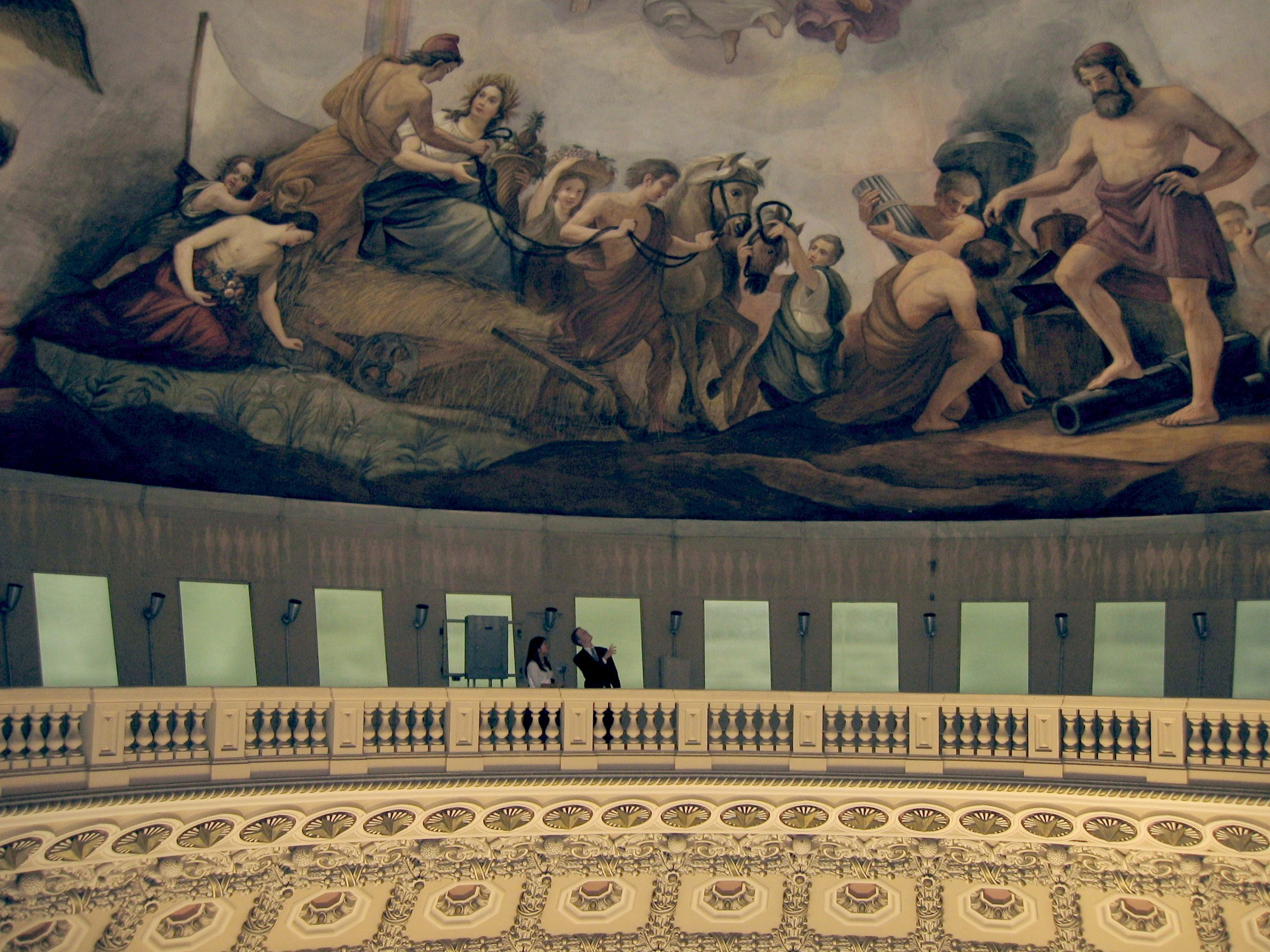
Visitors standing on the balcony beneath The Apotheosis of Washington

Visitation of the dome is highly restricted, usually offered only to members of Congress and their select guests. When looking up from the rotunda floor, the railing some 180 feet (55 m) above is barely visible. Visitors ascend a series of metal stairs between the inner and outer domes. They eventually wind their way to a balcony just underneath the Apotheosis of Washington. From this view, the painting is curved and distorted. From the balcony, metal stairs take visitors over the painting and up to the outside balcony under the tholos directly beneath the Statue of Freedom. Additional stairs lead up into the statue for maintenance.

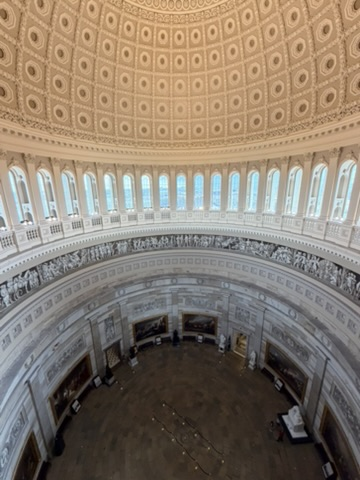
The Inside of the Capital Rotunda

Within the columned tholos upon which stands the Statue of Freedom, is found the Session or Convene light which signifies one or both chambers being in a night session.

Restoration and conservation of the Capitol Dome's cantilevered peristyle and skirting occurred in 2012. In 2013, the Architect of the Capitol announced a tentative four-year, $10 million project to repair and conserve the Capitol dome. The project involved both interior work to the rotunda, and exterior work on the dome. The proposal would require erecting white scaffolding around the dome, stripping the paint, repairing the ironwork, repainting the dome, and installing new lighting. The work was needed because the dome, which last underwent repair and conservation in 1960, was rusting and some ironwork had fallen from the structure. Congress had appropriated no funds for the project, however.

A $60-million, two-year restoration started in early 2014 included removing paint, priming and quickly repainting. Steel pins and "metal stitching" were used to repair cracks, and water damage inside was fixed. Scaffolding was erected around the dome in November 2014. The project was slated to be completed and the scaffolding removed in time for the 2017 presidential inauguration, and indeed all exterior scaffolding was removed by the end of summer 2016.

Papers relating to the construction of the dome are archived at the Cornell University Library as Collection No. 3244.

== See also ==
- 18th-century Western domes
- History of modern period domes
- List of tallest domes
- Architecture of Washington, D.C.
- Symbolism of domes

== Gallery ==
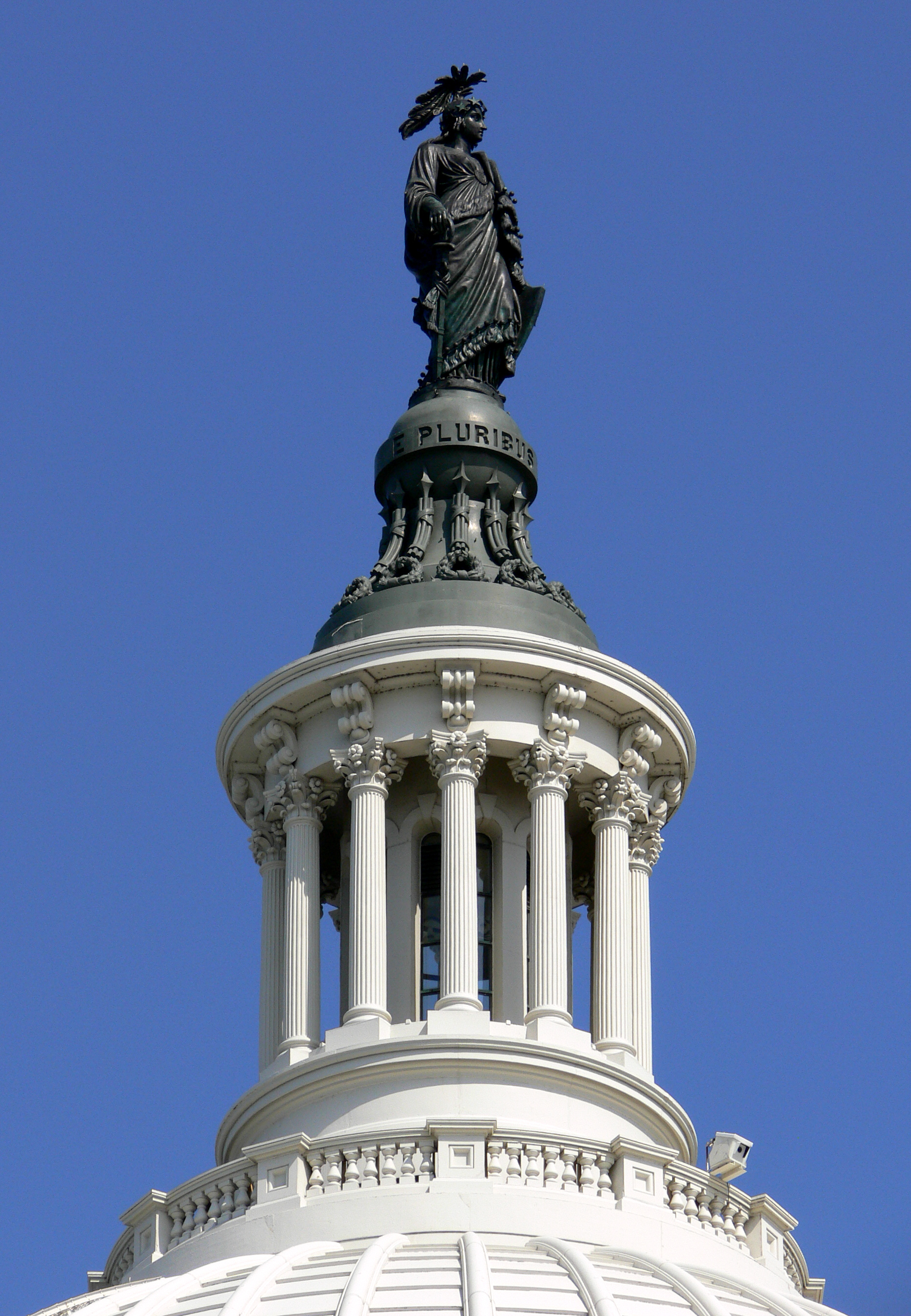
The Statue of Freedom, a bronze statue that, since 1863, has crowned the dome of the U.S. Capitol

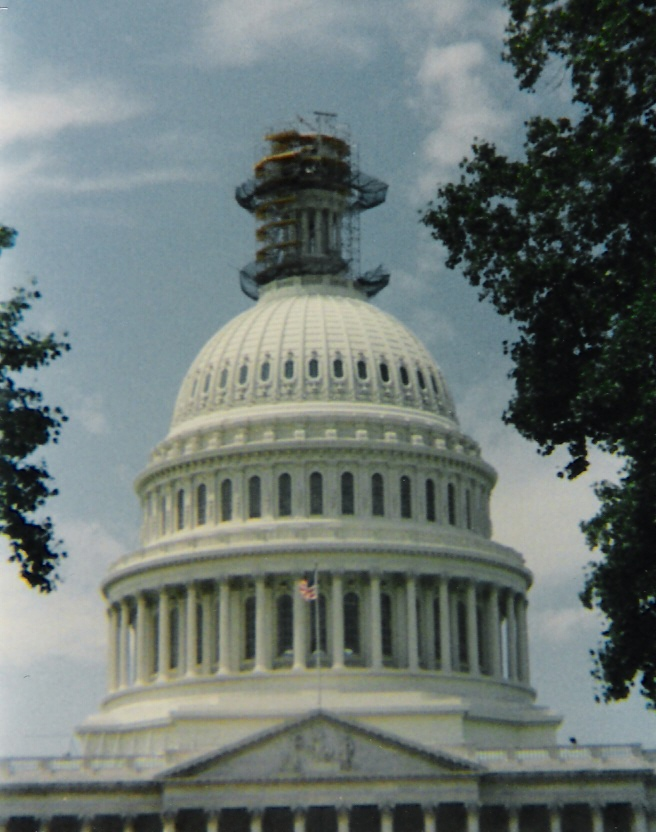
Scaffolding on the Capitol dome during the 1993 restoration of the Statue of Freedom

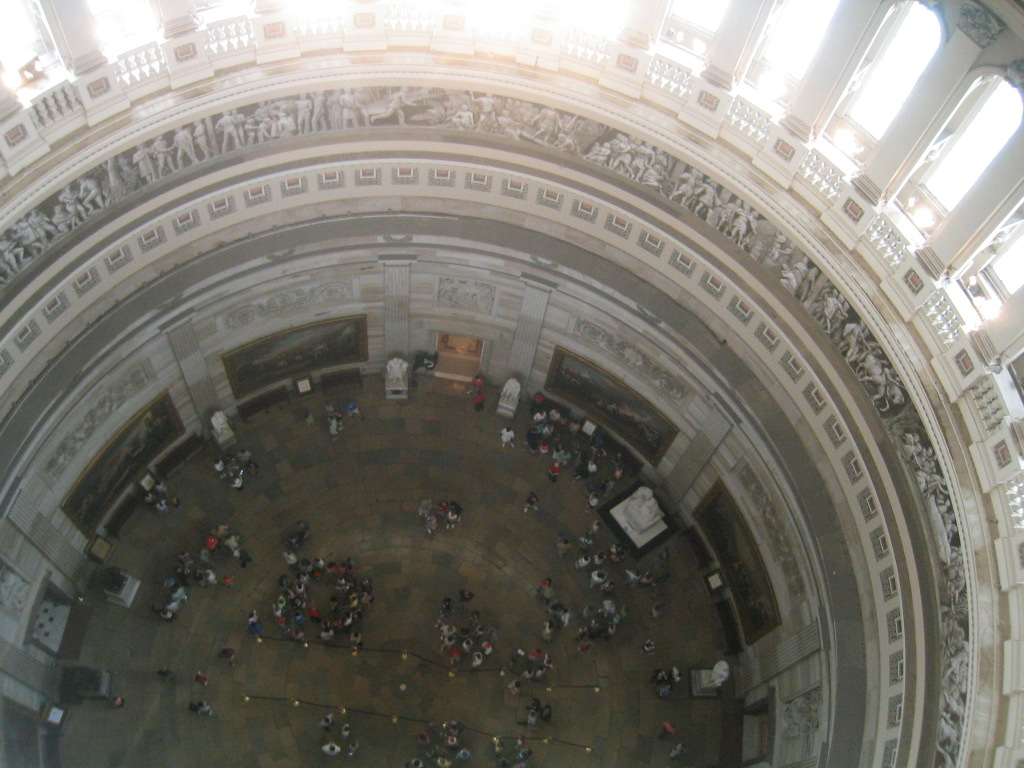
View of the floor of the Rotunda from the interior balcony directly beneath the Apotheosis of Washington, 180 feet (55 m) above the Rotunda floor

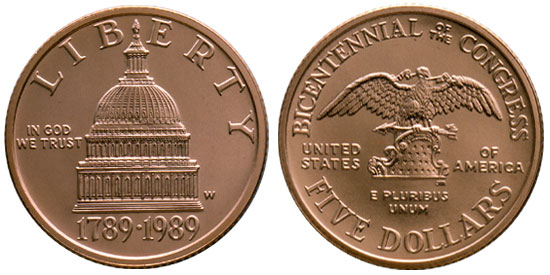
The dome appears on the obverse of the 1989 Congress Bicentennial commemorative $5 Gold Half Eagle

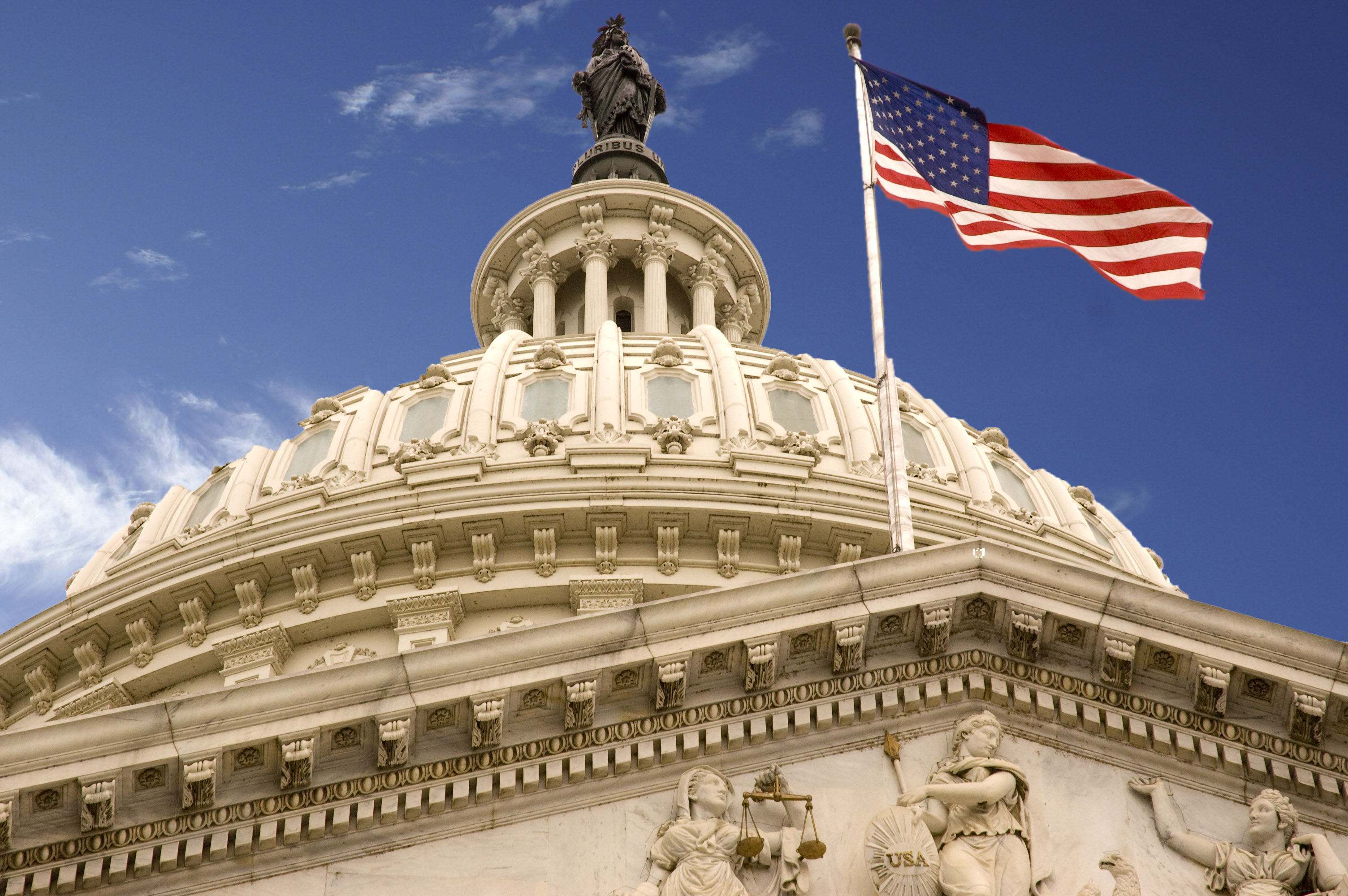
The U.S. Capitol Dome with United States Flag

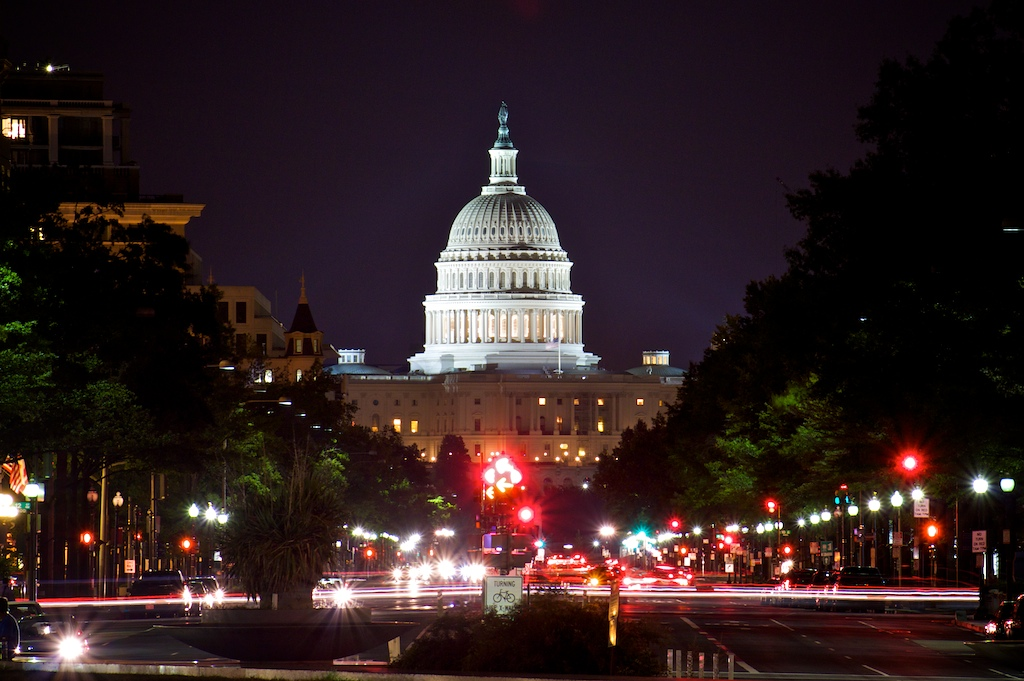
The U.S. Capitol Building lit up at night with the streets of Washington D.C.

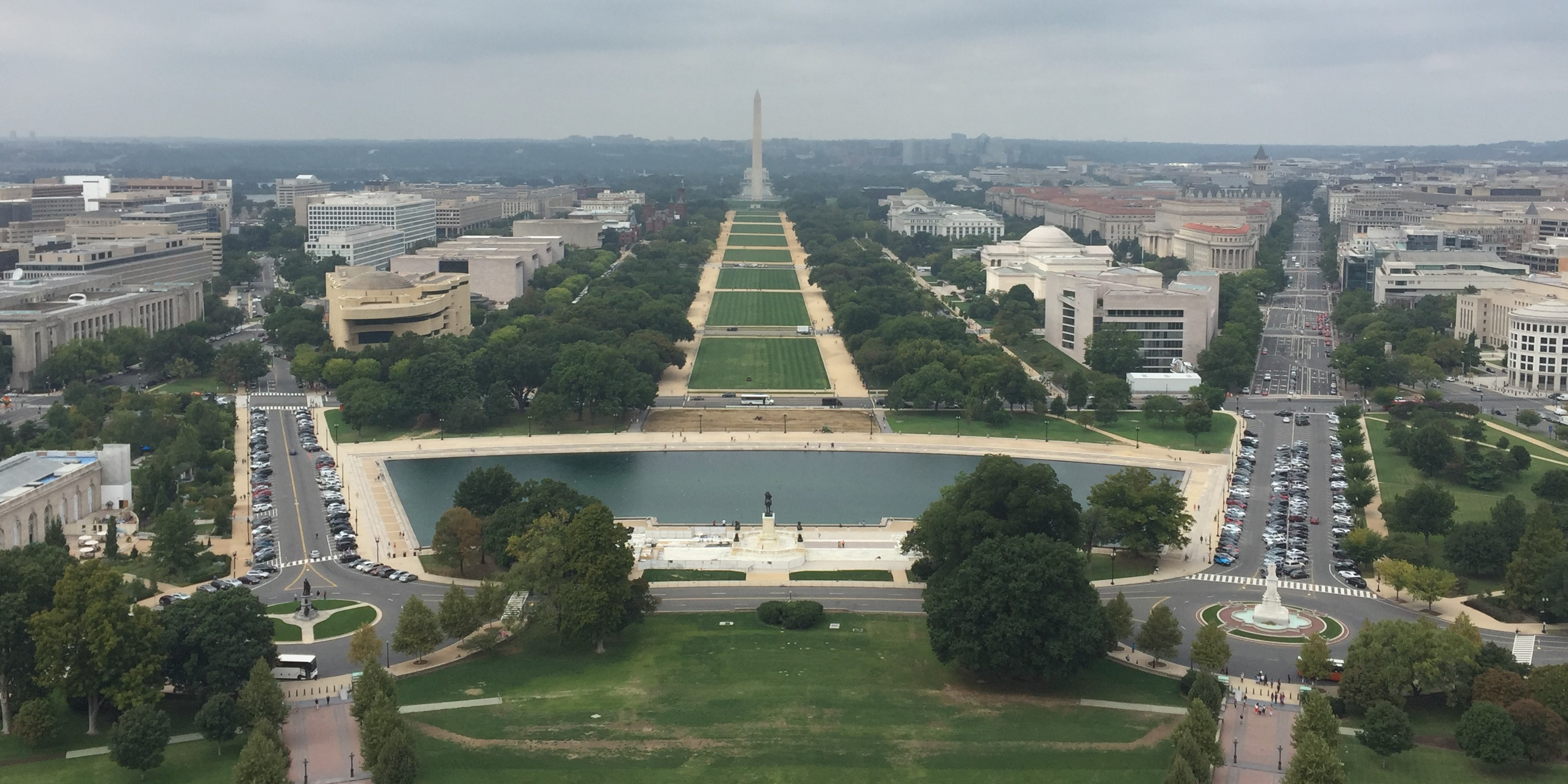
A view from the top of the U.S. Capitol Dome

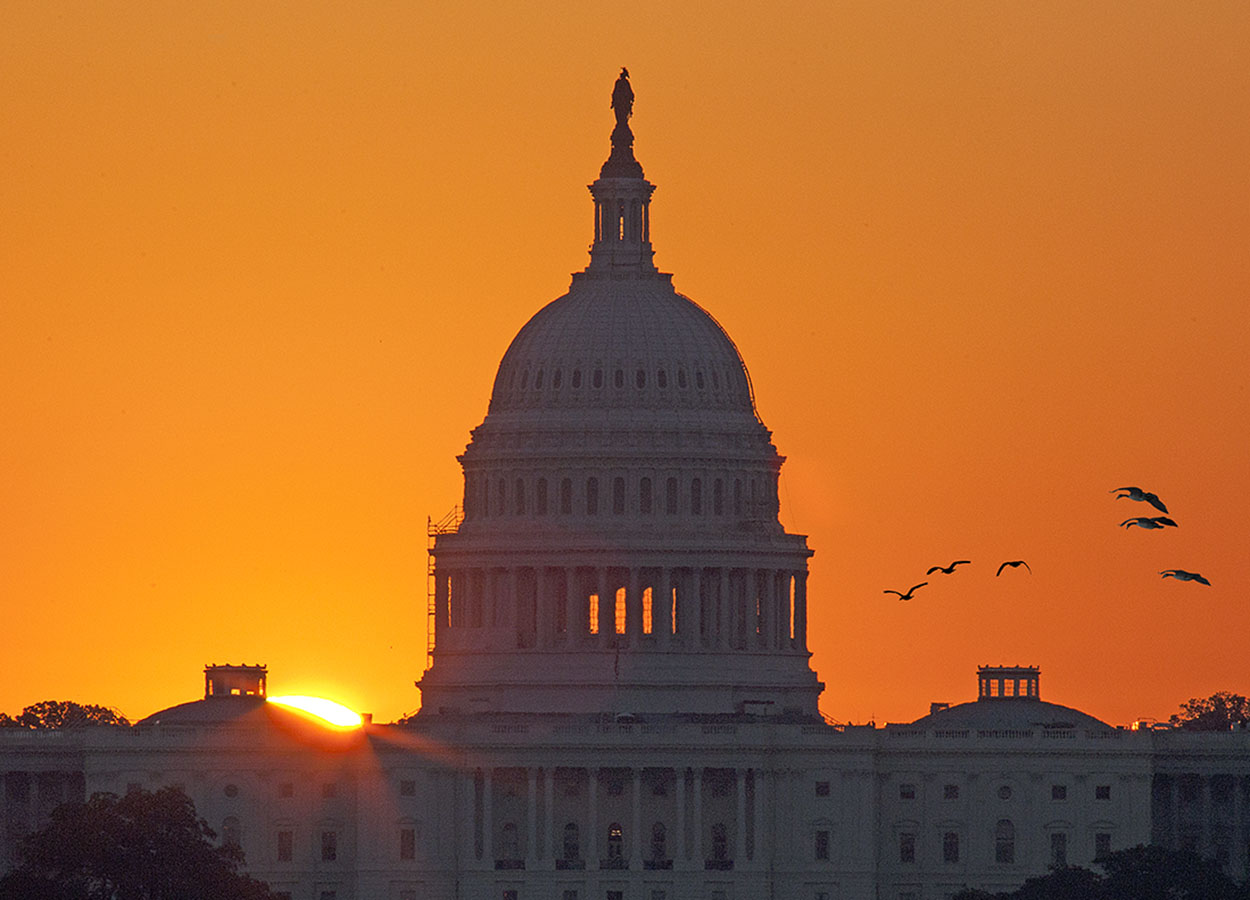
The U.S. Capitol Dome at sunrise
