= Saleaudo =

Historic house in Maryland, US

- U.S. National Register of Historic Places
- Location within Maryland Location within the United States
- Location: 1242 New Design Road, Adamstown, Maryland
- Coordinates: 39°16′7″N 77°28′37″W
- Area: 156.5 acres (63.3 ha)
- Built: 1856
- NRHP reference No.: 79003258
- Added to NRHP: September 24, 1979

Saleaudo is a historic home located at Adamstown, Frederick County, Maryland, United States. It is a two-story brick house built about 1856, with four interior brick chimneys. The house features murals painted by Constantino Brumidi and Filip Castaggini in the entrance hall.

Saleaudo was listed on the National Register of Historic Places in 1979.
