= The Parable (statue) =

Public sculpture in Washington, D.C.

- The Parable in 2022
- Artist: Jimilu Mason
- Year: 1990
- Type: Bronze
- Dimensions: 150 cm (60 in)
- Location: Washington, D.C., United States; 38°55′31.46″N 77°2′17.11″W
- Owner: The Festival Center

The Parable is a public artwork by American artist Jimilu Mason, located at The Festival Center at 1640 Columbia Road, N.W. in Washington, D.C., United States. The Parable was originally surveyed as part of the Smithsonian's Save Outdoor Sculpture! survey in 1993.

== Description ==
The bronze sculpture shows a man seated on a large cinder block and at his feet is a carpenter's square. Dressed in only a shirt and pants, his shirt sleeves are rolled up above his elbows and his collar is open. His face wears a beard and mustache and his feet are shoe-less. His arms reach out in front of him, and he looks as if in conversation.

== Information ==
According to Mason the sculpture "represents a Christ... teaching that there is more than brick and mortar to building a city. The leaders must be good servants."

== Condition ==
This sculpture was surveyed in 1993 for its condition and it was described that "treatment needed".

== See also ==
- The Servant Christ
- List of statues of Jesus
