= The Servant Christ =

Artwork by Jimilu Mason

- Artist: Jimilu Mason
- Year: 1986
- Type: Bronze
- Dimensions: 332.90 cm (131.064 in); 154.8 cm diameter (60.96 in)
- Location: Washington, D.C.; 38°55′28.91″N 77°2′23.29″W
- Owner: The Christ House

The Servant Christ is a public artwork by American artist Jimilu Mason, located at Christ House, 1717 Columbia Road, NW in Washington, D.C., United States. The Servant Christ was originally surveyed as part of the Smithsonian's Save Outdoor Sculpture! survey in 1994.

== Description ==
The bronze sculpture is a contemporary depiction of Jesus Christ, wearing a sweatshirt, pants and no shoes. He kneels down and his hands hover over a bowl installed in the base of the sculpture. He has a beard and mustache and looks upwards to the sky. The sculpture is a working fountain with water flowing up from the bowl and into the figure's proper left hand.

A plaque nearby is inscribed with:

Jimilu (American)
THE SERVANT OF CHRIST
MEEKLY I FIT MY STATUE TO YOUR NEED
TILL BY SNECHART (sic) I SHALL ACHIEVE MY
MORIAL (sic) PLAN.
TO PASS THE LOW INITIAL OF THE HUMAN
HEART.
FROM IMMANANCE (sic) BY
EVALYN UNDERHILL

== Background ==
The sculpture is installed on the sidewalk in front of Christ House, a medical facility for homeless men. The statue represents Christ offering to wash the feet of the people of the Adams Morgan neighborhood where the sculpture is located. The sculpture faces towards the building at a relief on the wall and under the window of a sun-room. According to the artist, "the men in the sunroom window become a living part of the men and women and children in the Frieze, which represents the richness of the cultural diversity in Adams Morgan."

When the work was installed, people questioned why Mason would want to have the piece displayed outside "where it would surely be abused". In response, Mason said "there is very little they could do to him that hasn't already been done".

== Condition ==
This sculpture was surveyed in 1994 for its condition and it was described that treatment was needed.

== See also ==
- The Parable
- List of statues of Jesus
