= Taylor's Chapel =

- U.S. National Register of Historic Places
- Baltimore City Landmark
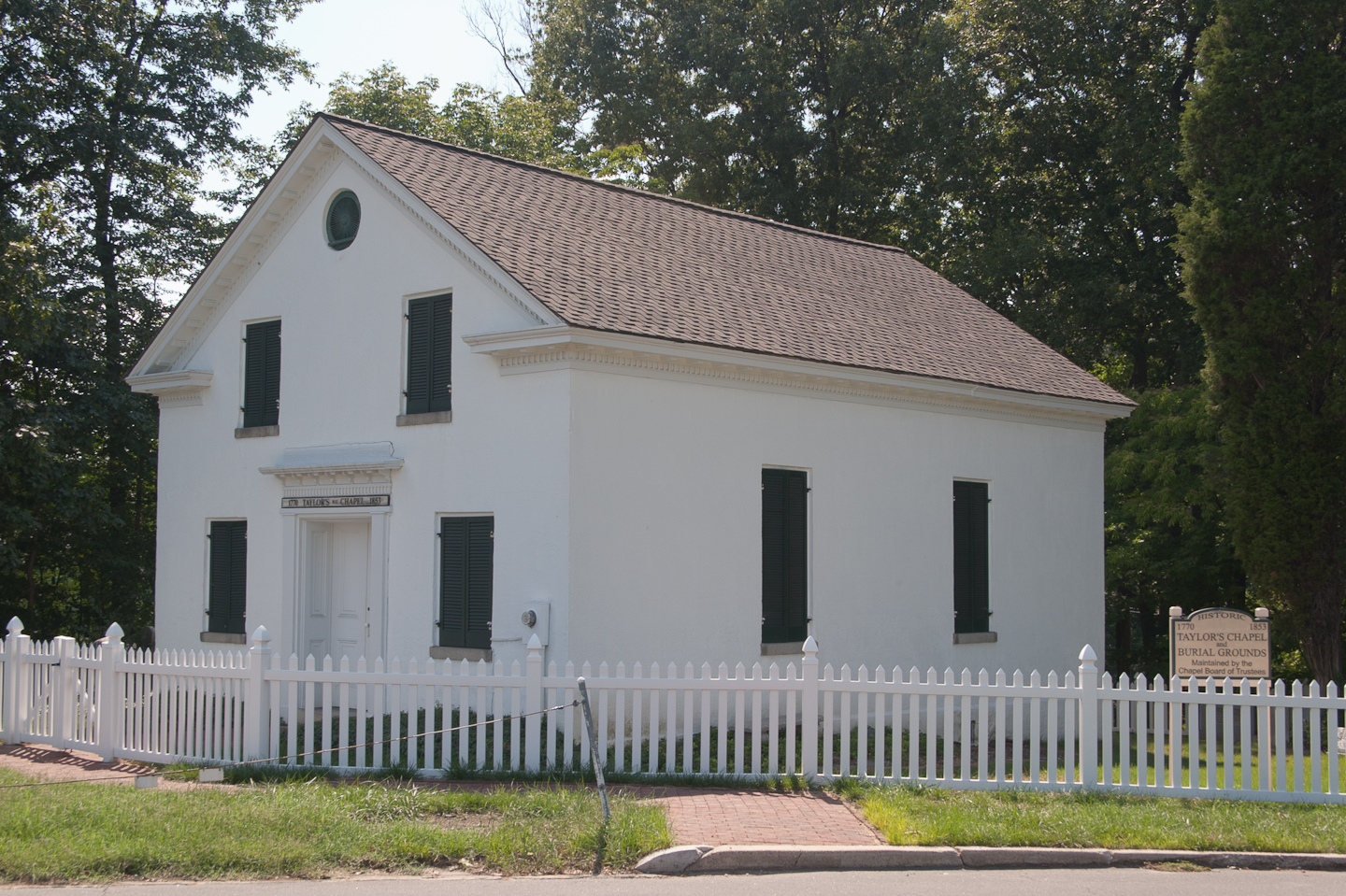
- Taylor's Chapel, August 2011

- Location within Baltimore Location within Maryland Location within the United States
- Location: 6001 Hillen Rd., Mount Pleasant Park, Baltimore, Maryland
- Coordinates: 39°21′46″N 76°34′40″W
- Area: 0.3 acres (0.12 ha)
- Built: 1853
- Architectural style: Greek Revival
- NRHP reference No.: 83002940

Significant dates
- Added to NRHP: July 28, 1983
- Designated BCL: 1977

Taylor's Chapel is an historic chapel located at Baltimore, Maryland, United States. It is a Greek Revival style chapel located in a quarter acre fenced-in plot, which also includes a graveyard, within Mount Pleasant Park in northeast Baltimore. The structure is a small, mid-19th-century country church, built of stone, covered with stucco, painted white, and has a gable roof. The interior features frescoes on the walls and ceiling, attributed by tradition to the Italian-American painter Constantino Brumidi. The frescoes are trompe-l'œil paintings of classical architectural detailing, including pilasters, panels, coffering, and ornaments. It has remained completely unaltered since its construction in 1853. It was built as a Methodist chapel by the Taylor family on their Mt. Pleasant plantation. In 1925 the City of Baltimore purchased the land surrounding the chapel and burial grounds for use as a public golf course. The site of the chapel and burial grounds was left to a self-perpetuating board of trustees. Taylor's Chapel is considered the mother church of St. John's United Methodist Church of Hamilton.

Taylor's Chapel was listed on the National Register of Historic Places in 1983.
