= The Apotheosis of Washington =

Fresco by Constantino Brumidi

Coordinates: 38°53′23″N 77°0′32″W

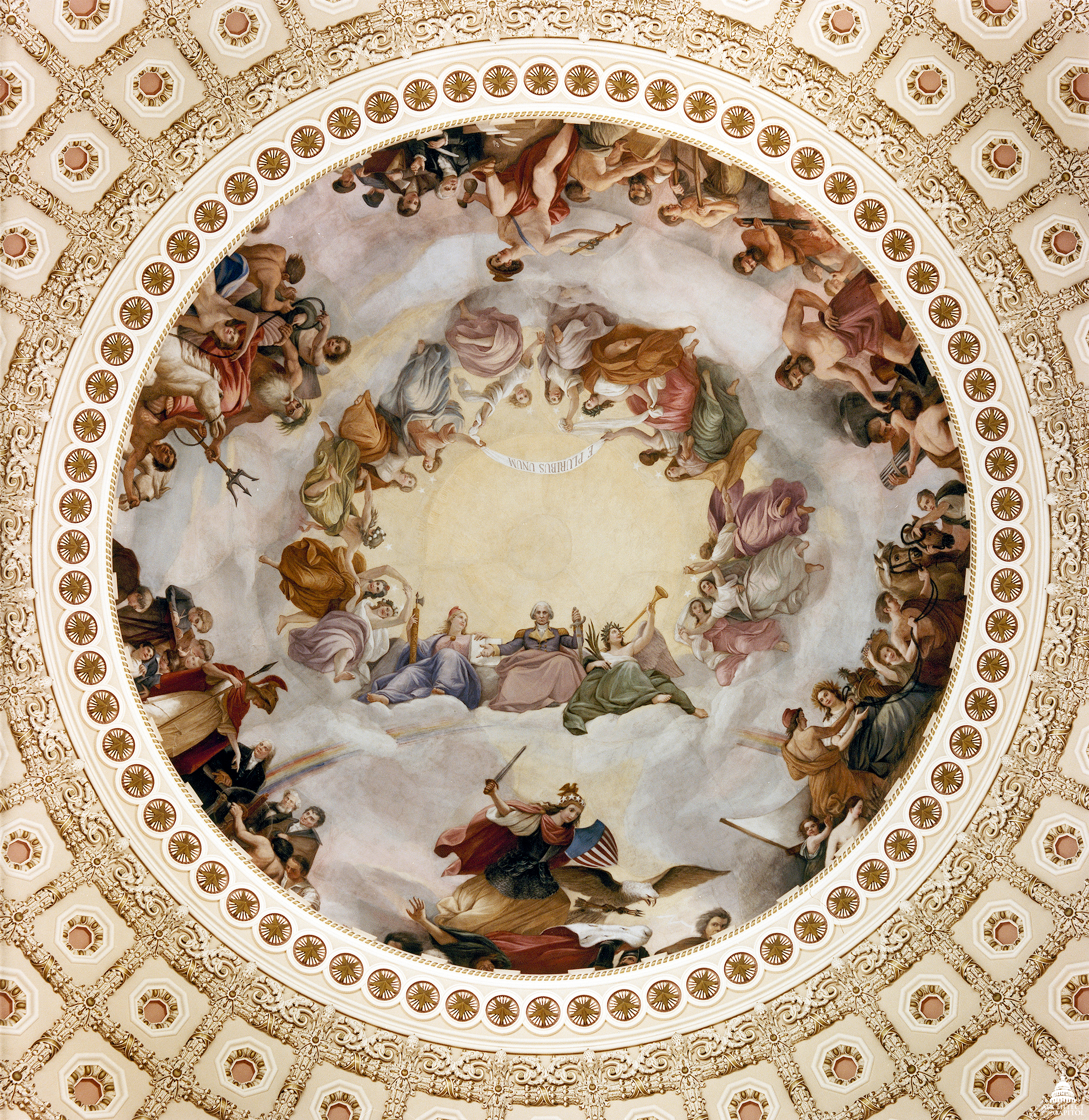
The Apotheosis of Washington on the ceiling of the Capitol rotunda inside the United States Capitol

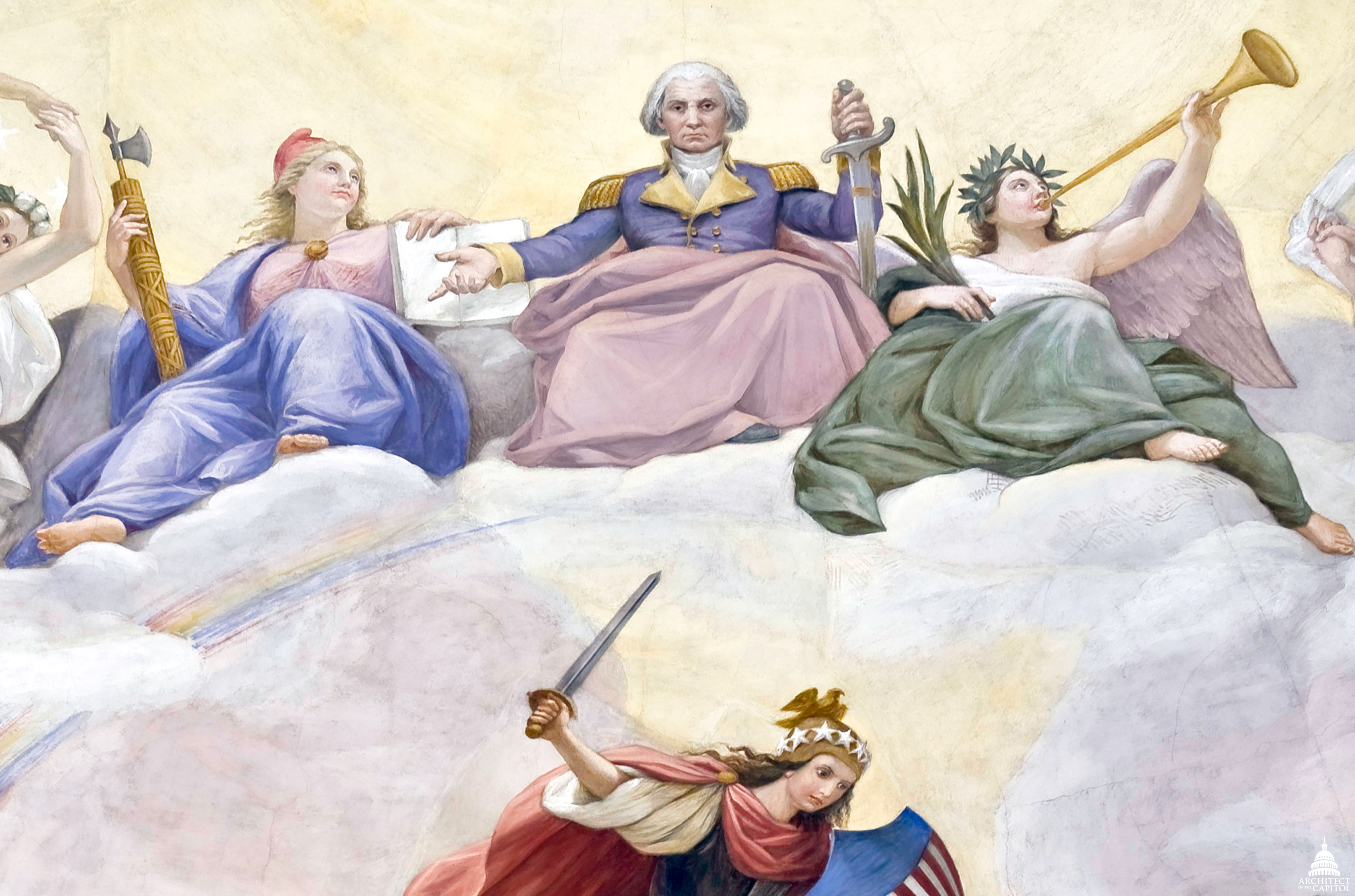
Detail of George Washington in the fresco

The Apotheosis of Washington is the fresco painted by Greek-Italian artist Constantino Brumidi in 1865 and visible through the oculus of the dome in the rotunda of the United States Capitol Building in Washington, D.C.

The fresco is suspended 180 feet (55 m) above the rotunda floor and covers an area of 4,664 square feet (433.3 m^{2}). The figures painted are up to 15 feet (4.6 m) tall and are visible from the floor below. The dome was completed in 1863, and Brumidi painted it over the course of eleven months at the end of the American Civil War. He was paid $40,000 ($841,304 in today's funds) for the fresco.

Brumidi had worked for three years in the Vatican under Pope Gregory XVI, and served several aristocrats as an artist for palaces and villas, including the prince Torlonia. He immigrated to the United States in 1852, and spent much of the last 25 years of his life working in the Capitol. In addition to The Apotheosis of Washington, Brumidi designed the Brumidi Corridors, ornately decorated corridors on the first floor of the Senate wing of the Capitol.

== Symbolism ==
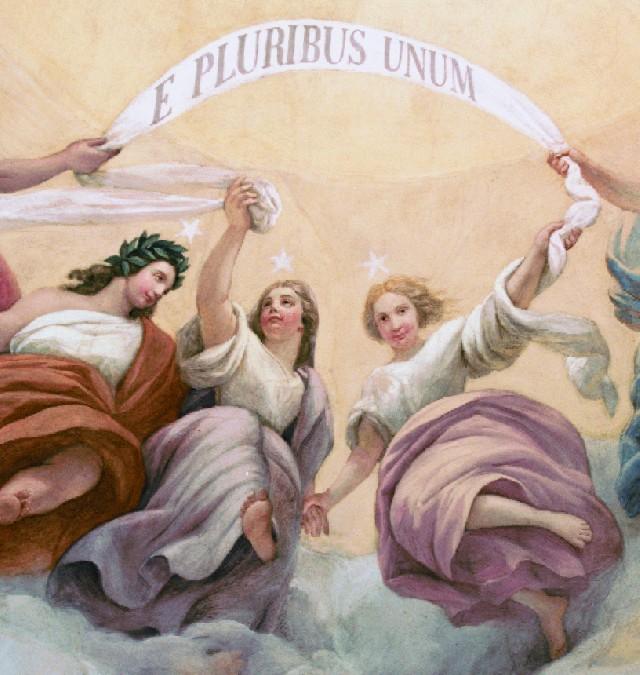
Opposite George Washington is the banner E Pluribus Unum, Latin for "out of many, one".

The Apotheosis of Washington depicts George Washington sitting among the heavens in an exalted manner, or in literary terms, ascending and becoming a god (apotheosis). Washington, the first U.S. president and commander-in-chief of the Continental Army during the American Revolutionary War, is allegorically represented, surrounded by figures from classical mythology.

George Washington is draped in purple, worn by generals of the ancient Roman Republic during their triumphs, with a rainbow arch at his feet, flanked by the goddess Victoria, who is draped in green, blowing a horn, to his left and the goddess Liberty to his right. Liberty wears a red liberty cap, symbolizing emancipation, from a Roman tradition where slaves being manumitted would be given a felt cap (Latin pileus). She holds a fasces in her right hand and an open book in the other, to which George Washington gestures with his right hand.

Forming a circle between Liberty and Victory are 13 maidens, each with a star above her head representing the original Thirteen Colonies. Several of the maidens have their backs turned to George Washington, said to represent the colonies that had seceded from the Union at the time of painting. Across the circle from George Washington is the banner E Pluribus Unum, Latin for "out of many, one".

Surrounding George Washington, the two goddesses and the 13 maidens are six scenes lining the perimeter, each representing a national concept allegorically: from directly below George Washington in the center and moving clockwise, "War", "Science", "Marine", "Commerce", "Mechanics" and "Agriculture". The perimeter scenes are not fully visible from the floor of the United States Capitol.

Scene	Description
	War; Freedom (also known as Columbia) as Bellona, is directly below George Washington. The scene depicts a woman fighting for liberty with a raised sword, a cape, and a helmet and shield (in the colors of the U.S. flag) trampling figures representing Tyranny and Kingly Power. To Freedom's left assisting her is a fierce bald eagle (the national bird of the United States) as the Eagle of Zeus, carrying arrows and a thunderbolt (reminiscent of the arrows carried by the eagle in the Great Seal of the United States).
	Science; Minerva, the Roman goddess of crafts and wisdom, is portrayed with helmet and spear pointing to an electrical generator creating power stored in batteries next to a printing press, representing great American inventions. American scientists and inventors Benjamin Franklin, Samuel F. B. Morse, and Robert Fulton watch. In the left part of the scene a teacher demonstrates the use of dividers.
	Marine; This scene shows Neptune, the Roman sea-god, with trident and crown of seaweed riding in a shell chariot drawn by sea horses. Venus, goddess of love born from the sea, is depicted helping to lay the transatlantic telegraph cable which ran from North America to the Telegraph Field in Ireland. In the background is an ironclad warship with smokestacks.
	Commerce; Mercury, the Roman god of commerce, with his winged petasos and sandals and a caduceus, is depicted giving a bag of gold to American Revolutionary War financier Robert Morris. To the left, men move a box on a dolly; on the right, the anchor and sailors lead into "Marine".
	Mechanics; Vulcan, the Roman god of fire and the forge, is depicted standing at an anvil with his foot on a cannon next to a pile of cannonballs. A steam engine is in the background. The man at the forge is thought to represent Charles Thomas, the supervisor of ironwork during the construction of the Capitol dome.
	Agriculture; Ceres, the Roman goddess of agriculture, is shown with a wreath of wheat and a cornucopia, symbol of plenty, while sitting on a McCormick mechanical reaper. The personification of Young America in a liberty cap holds the reins of the horses, while the goddess Flora gathers flowers in the foreground.

== See also ==
- List of paintings of George Washington
- American civil religion
- Apotheosis
- Panthéon – building with a dome fresco titled The Apotheosis of Saint Genevieve
- George Washington (Greenough)
