= Charles Moberly =

English cricketer (1907–1996)

Personal information
- Full name: Charles Maurice Grahame Moberly
- Born: 8 February 1907; Cairo, Egypt
- Died: 13 August 1996 (aged 89); Winchester, Hampshire, England
- Batting: Right-handed
- Bowling: Right-arm medium
- Relatives: George Neale (brother-in-law)

Domestic team information
- Years: Team
- 1926/27: Up Country XI
- 1926: Dorset

Career statistics
Competition	First-class
Matches	1
Runs scored	1
Batting average	1.00
100s/50s	–/–
Top score	1
Balls bowled	60
Wickets	–
Bowling average	–
5 wickets in innings	–
10 wickets in match	–
Best bowling	–
Catches/stumpings	2/–
- Source: Cricinfo, 7 November 2011

Charles Maurice Grahame Moberly (8 December 1907 – 13 August 1996) was an English cricketer. Moberly was a right-handed batsman who bowled right-arm medium pace. He was born at Cairo, Egypt and educated at Sherborne School in England.

Moberly made three appearances Dorset in the 1926 Minor Counties Championship against Devon, Wiltshire and Hertfordshire. While in British Ceylon in February 1927, he made a single first-class appearance for Up Country XI against the touring Marylebone Cricket Club. He batted once in this match and was dismissed for a single run by Maurice Tate, while with the ball he a total of ten wicket-less overs.

He died at Winchester, Hampshire on 13 August 1996. His brother in law, George Neale, also played first-class cricket.
