= Constantino Brumidi =

Italian painter (1805–1880)

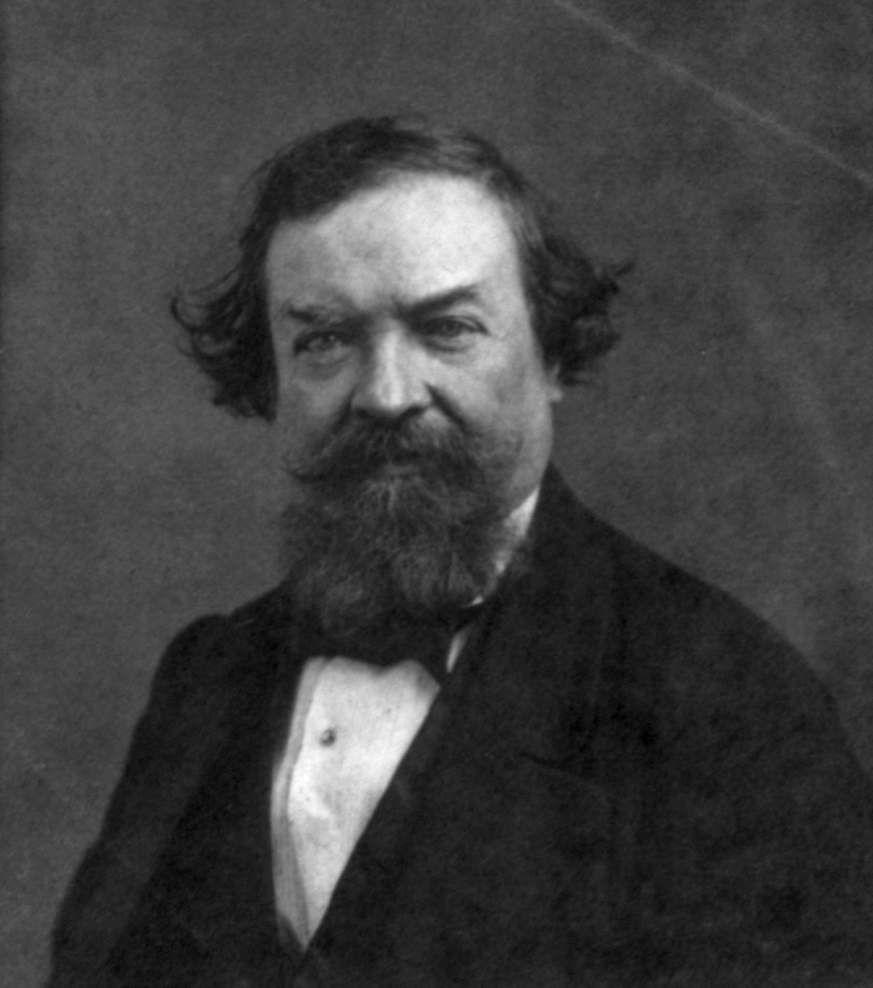
- Brumidi in 1861
- Born: 26 July 1805; Rome, Papal States (now Italy)
- Died: 19 February 1880 (aged 74); Washington, D.C., United States: American
- Education: Vatican
- Known for: Fresco painting
- Notable work: Apotheosis of Washington, Frieze of American History
- Movement: Neoclassical
- Awards: Congressional Gold Medal (posthumously)

Constantino Brumidi (26 July 1805 – 19 February 1880) was an Italian-American painter, born in Italy to an Italian mother & Greek father, he was later naturalized an American citizen, best known and honored for his fresco work, Apotheosis of Washington, in the Capitol Building in Washington, D.C.

== Parentage and early life ==
Brumidi was born in Rome, his father a Greek from Filiatra in the province of Messenia, Greece, and his mother an Italian. He showed his talent for fresco painting at an early age and underwent training in the fields of sculpture and painting, under the tutelage of artists such as Bertel Thorvaldsen, Antonio Canova, and Baron Vincenzo Camuccini. Brumidi painted in several Roman palaces, among them being that of Prince Torlonia. Under Gregory XVI he worked for three years in the Vatican.

== Immigration and following work ==
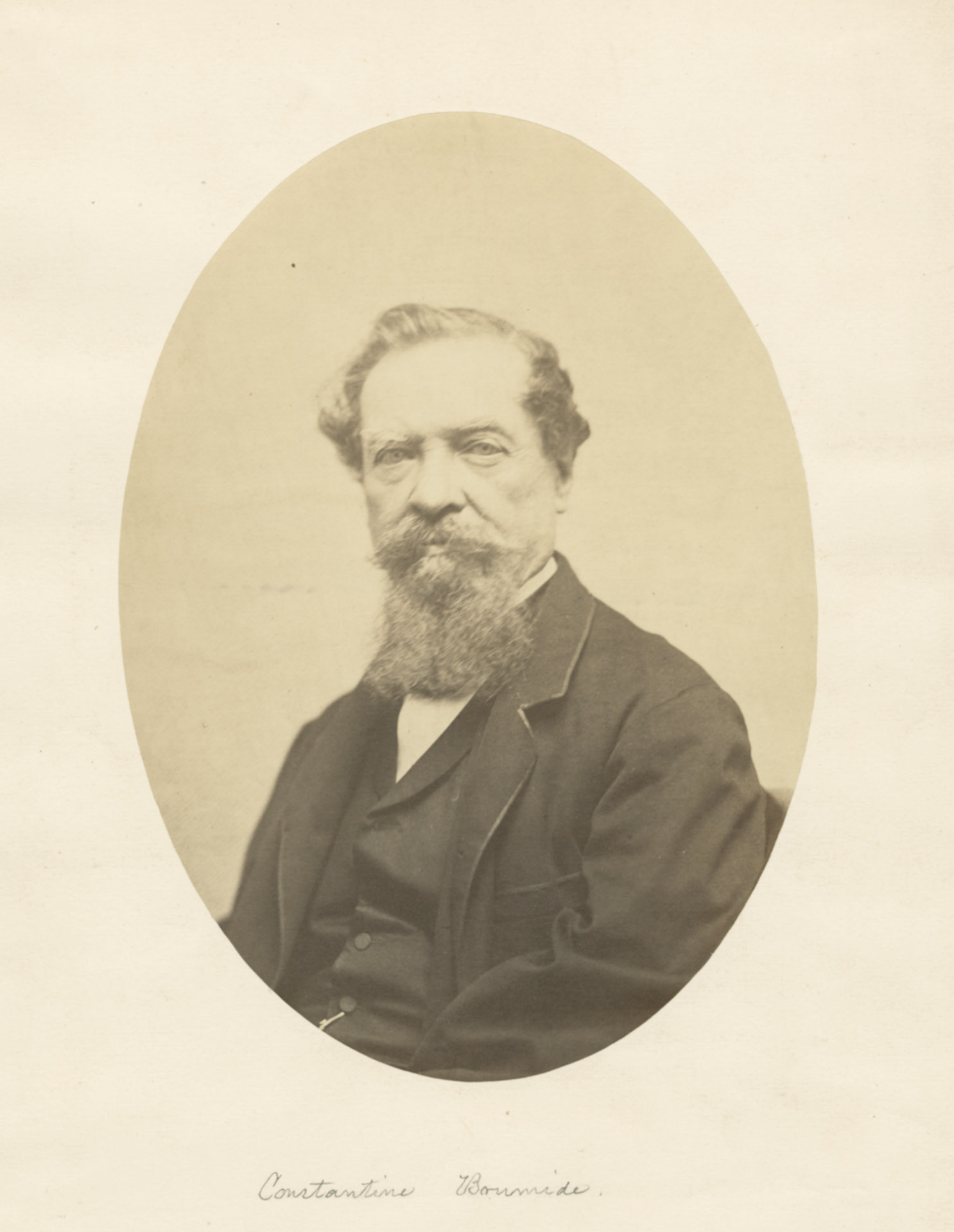
Constantino Brumidi by Alexander Gardner, c. 1865, albumen print

The occupation of Rome by French forces in 1849 apparently persuaded Brumidi to emigrate, having joined the short-lived risorgimental Roman Republic, and he sailed for the United States, where he became a naturalized citizen in 1852. Taking up his residence in New York City, the artist painted a number of portraits.

In 1854 Brumidi went to Mexico, where he painted an allegorical representation of the Holy Trinity for the altarpiece of the Mexico City Metropolitan Cathedral. Brumidi subsequently created several works for St. Stephen's Church in New York, including an altarpiece (1855) and murals (1866 and 1871–72).

Brumidi first visited the United States Capitol in the 1850s, after being introduced to Quartermaster General Montgomery C. Meigs, who was overseeing the completion of the Capitol dome and rotunda.

Brumidi also executed frescoes at Taylor's Chapel in Baltimore, Maryland.

His first art work in the Capitol Building was in the meeting room of the House Committee on Agriculture. At first he received eight dollars a day, which Jefferson Davis, then Secretary of War of the United States, helped increase to ten dollars. His work attracting much favorable attention, he was given further commissions, and gradually settled into the position of a Government painter. His chief work in Washington was done in the rotunda of the Capitol and included The Apotheosis of Washington in the dome and the Frieze of American History, which contains allegorical scenes from American history. His artistic vision was influenced by the wall paintings of Pompeii and ancient Rome, as well as the classical revivals that characterized the Renaissance and Baroque periods. His work in the rotunda was left unfinished at his death, but he had decorated many other sections of the building, most notably hallways in the Senate side of the Capitol now known as the Brumidi Corridors. Filippo Costaggini continued painting the frieze over the next 8 years based on the sketches Brumidi left; however, there was no sketch left for the final panel, which remained empty until 1953, when Allyn Cox designed and painted it.

Brumidi's Liberty and Union paintings are mounted near the ceiling of the White House entrance hall.

In the Cathedral-Basilica of Sts. Peter and Paul in Philadelphia, Pennsylvania, he pictured St. Peter and St. Paul. Brumidi was a capable, if conventional painter, and his black and white modeling in the work at Washington, in imitation of bas-relief, is strikingly effective. He decorated the entrance hall of Saleaudo, located at Frederick, Maryland, and listed on the National Register of Historic Places in 1979.

A Brumidi painting of St. Ignatius Loyola's Vision at La Storta was installed on November 28, 1856 and now appears behind the altar in St. Ignatius Church in Baltimore, Maryland. Another, of Saint Aloysius Gonzaga receiving communion from Saint Charles Borromeo, hangs over the high altar of St Aloysius Church in Washington, D.C.

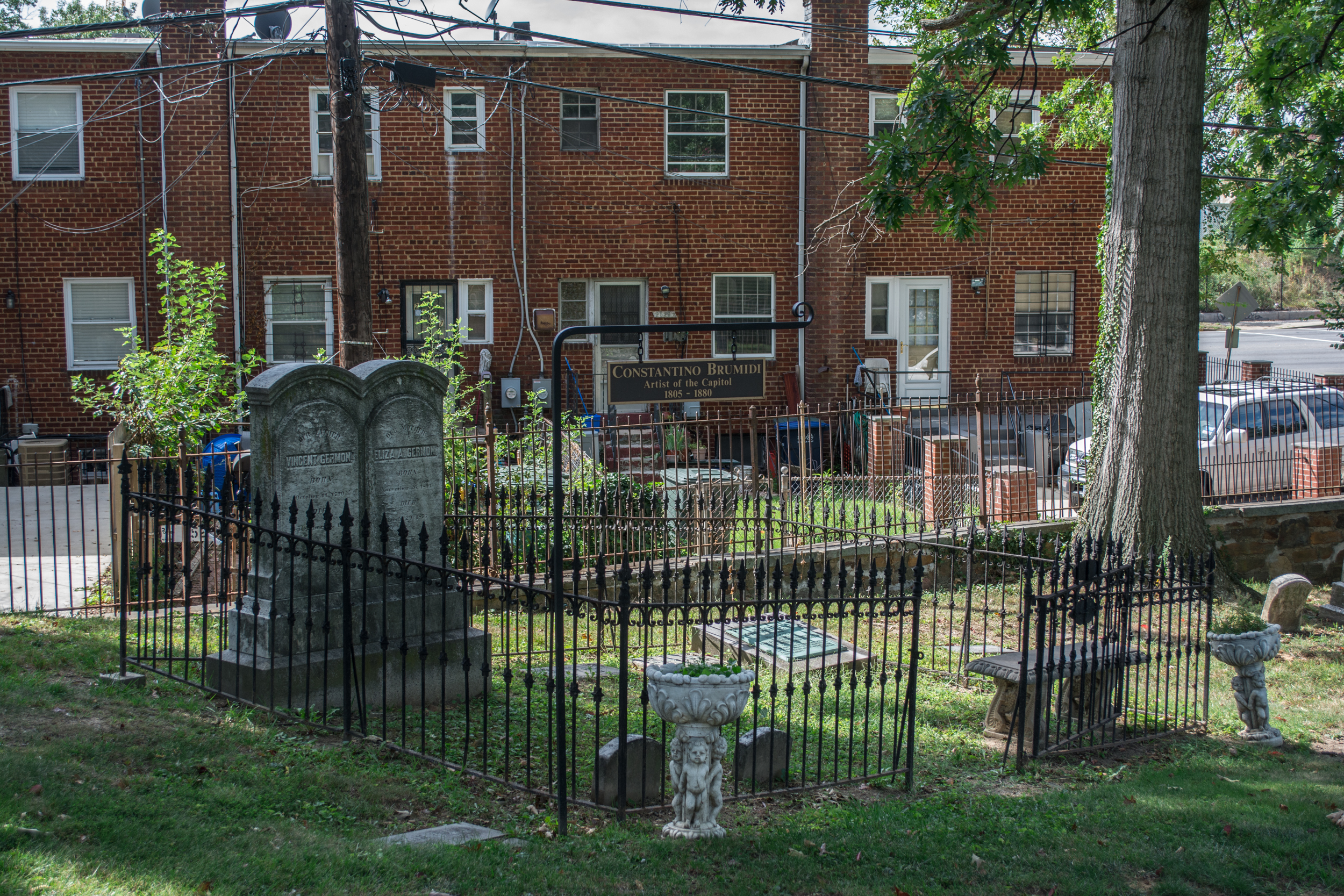
Grave of Constantino Brumidi, his wife, his son, and his in-laws at Glenwood Cemetery.

Another Brumidi altarpiece was recently restored behind the marble high altar of the Shrine and Parish Church of the Holy Innocents in New York, New York. The fresco commissioned by the first pastor of Holy Innocents, John Larkin, portrays the Crucifixion of Jesus.

== In memoriam ==
Brumidi died in Washington, D.C., and was interred at Glenwood Cemetery. When he was buried, his grave was unmarked. The location of Brumidi's grave was lost for 72 years. It was rediscovered, and on 19 February 1952, a marker was finally placed above it.

Forgotten for many years, Brumidi's role was rescued from obscurity by Myrtle Cheney Murdock.

On 10 June 2008, Congress passed, and on 1 September 2008, President George W. Bush signed, Public Law 110–59 (122 Stat. 2430), which posthumously awarded the Congressional Gold Medal to Constantino Brumidi, to be displayed in the Capitol Visitor Center, as part of an exhibit honoring him.

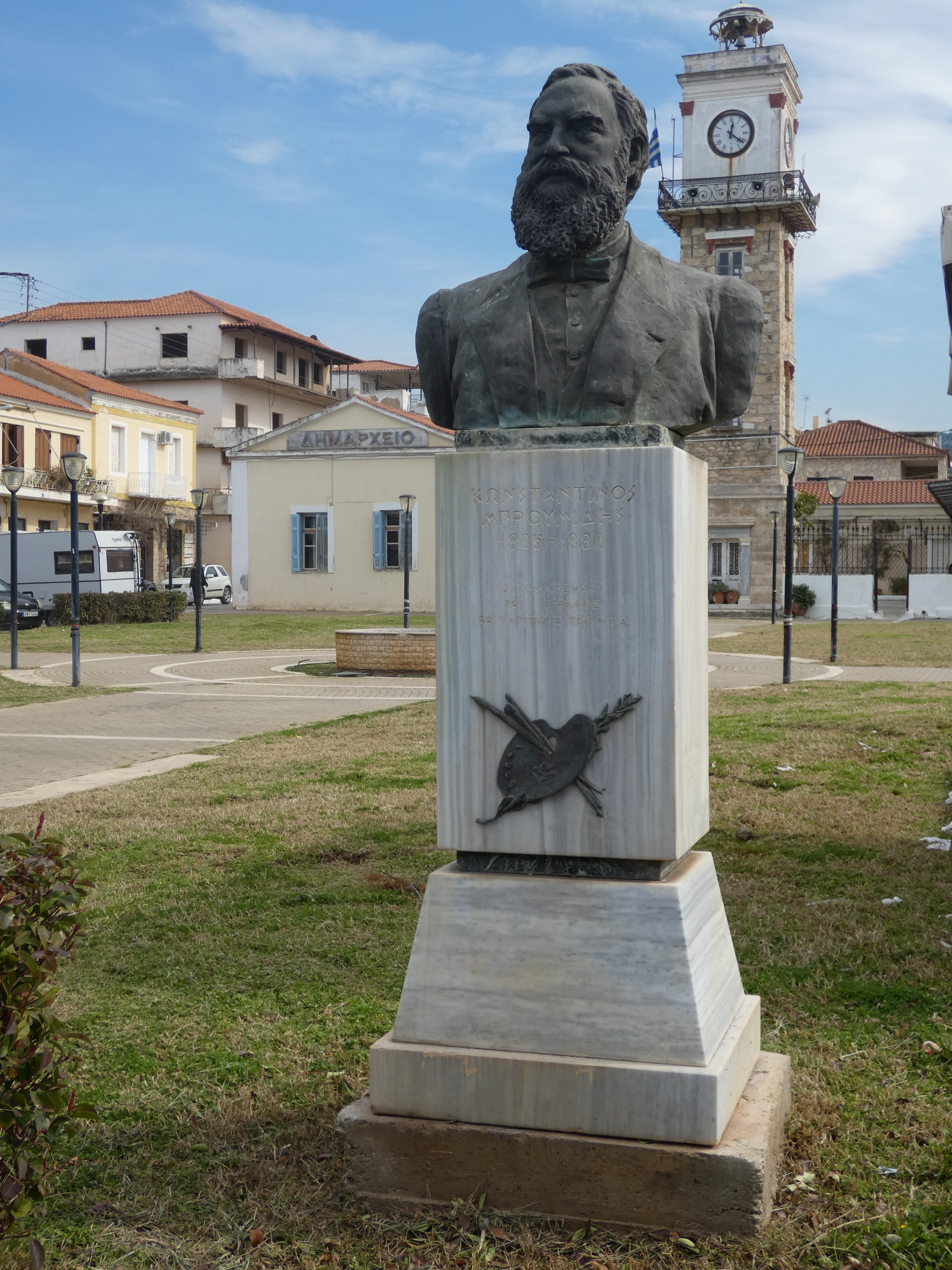
Statue of Constantino Brumidi near the central square of Filiatra, Greece, the hometown of his father

A memorial statue of Constantino Brumidi stands near the central square of Filiatra, Greece, the birthplace of his father.

== Gallery ==
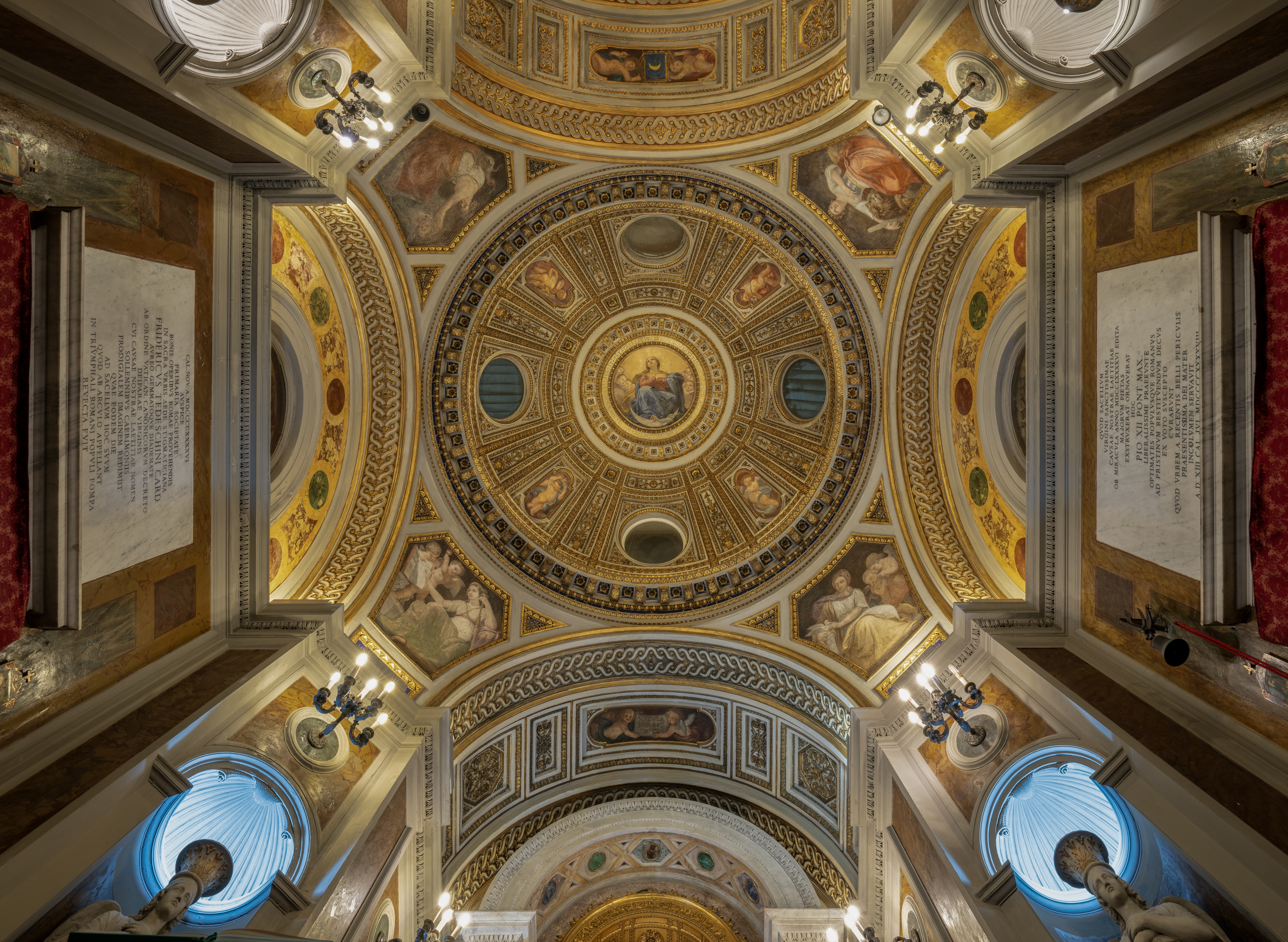
The dome of Madonna dell'Archetto

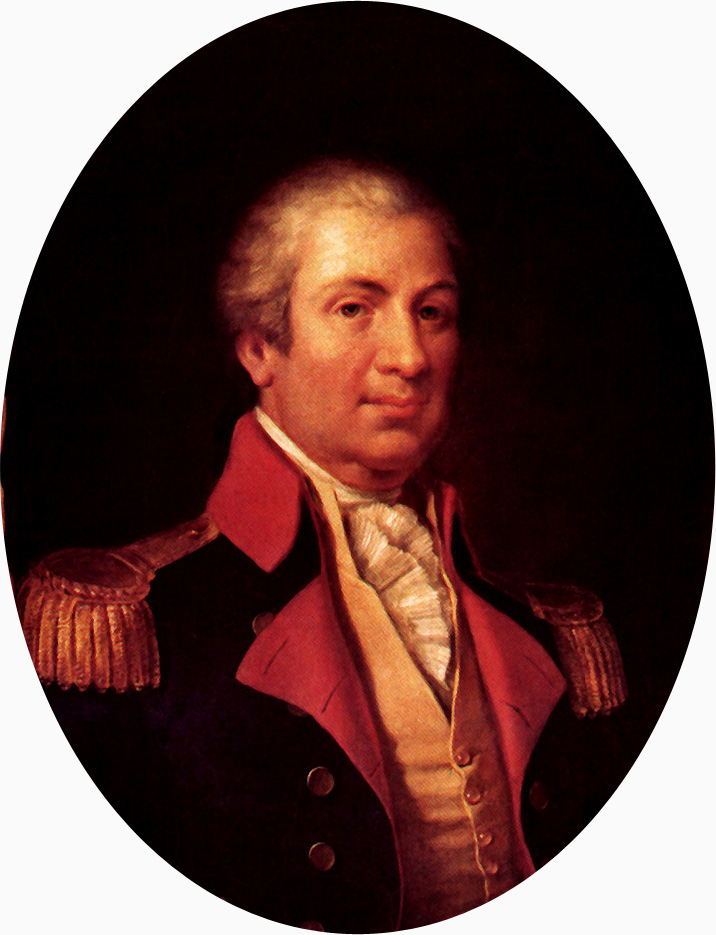
General Henry Knox, first United States Secretary of War

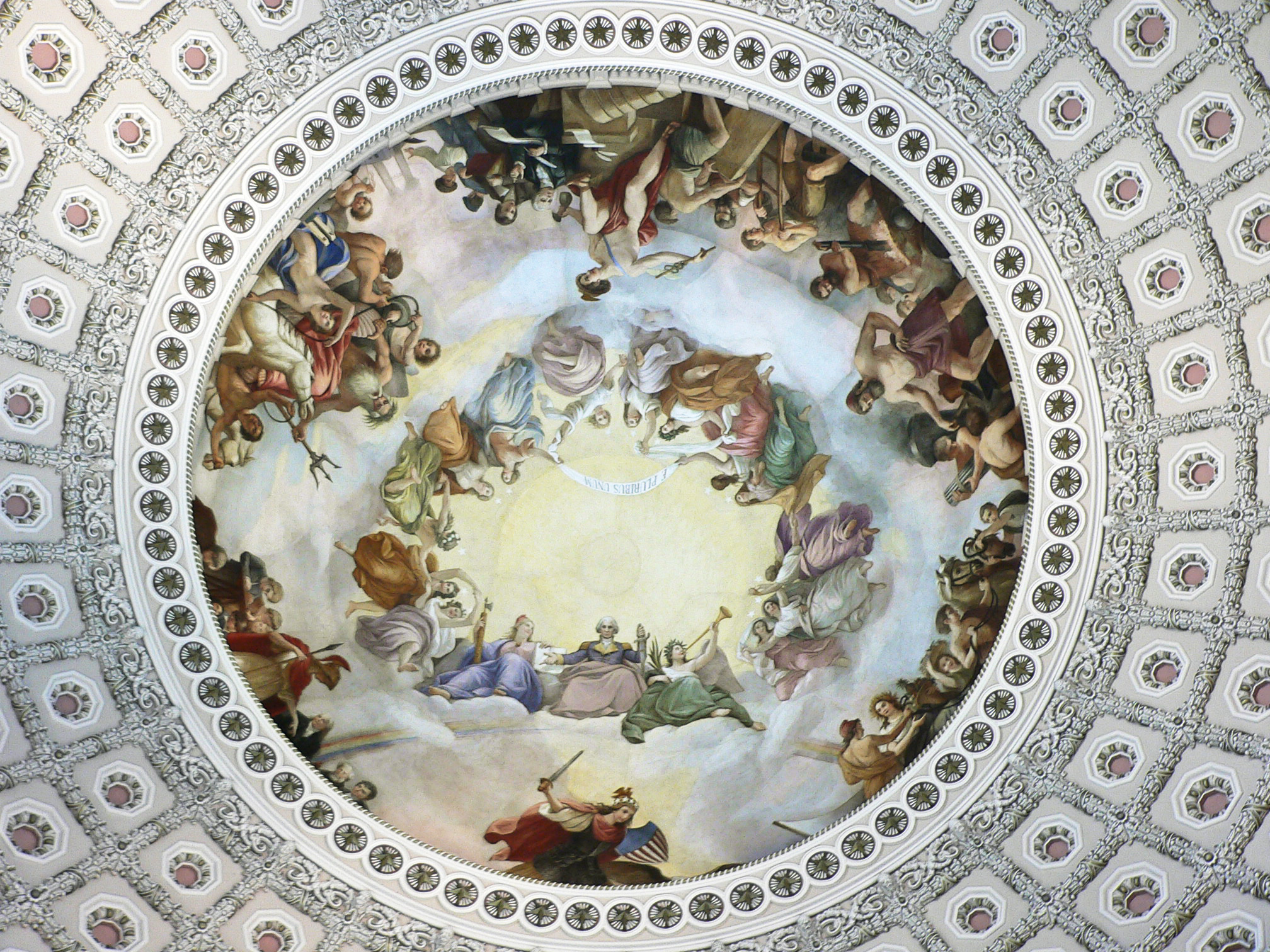
Brumidi's 1865 fresco Apotheosis of Washington adorns the underside of the dome in the rotunda of the United States Capitol

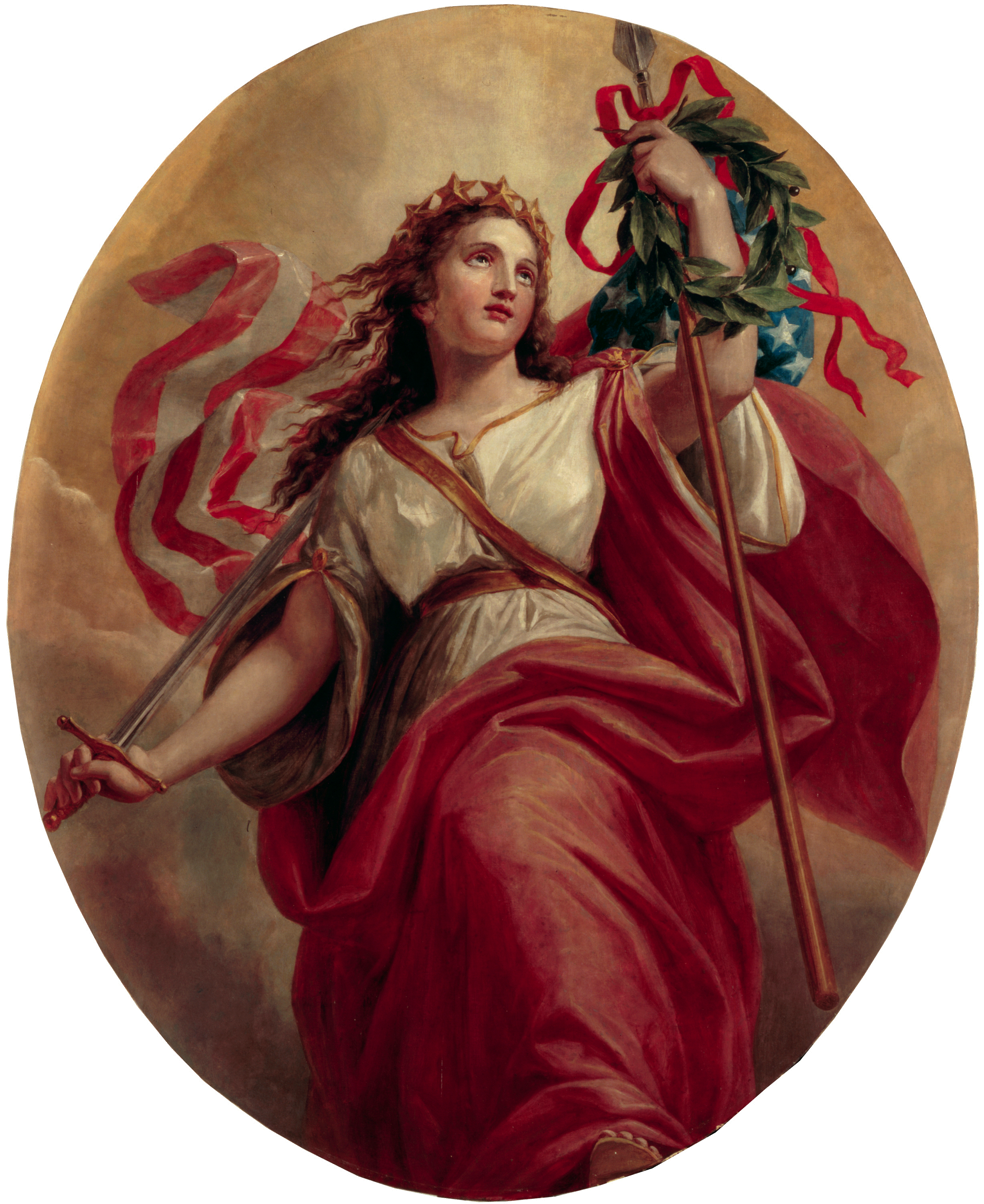
Brumidi's Liberty was mounted in the ceiling of the White House entrance hall

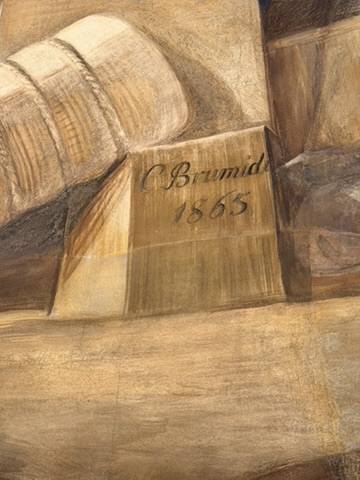
Constantino Brumidi's signature on The Apotheosis of Washington

== See also ==
- Allyn Cox, a later United States Capitol muralist
