= John Trumbull =

American artist (1756–1843)

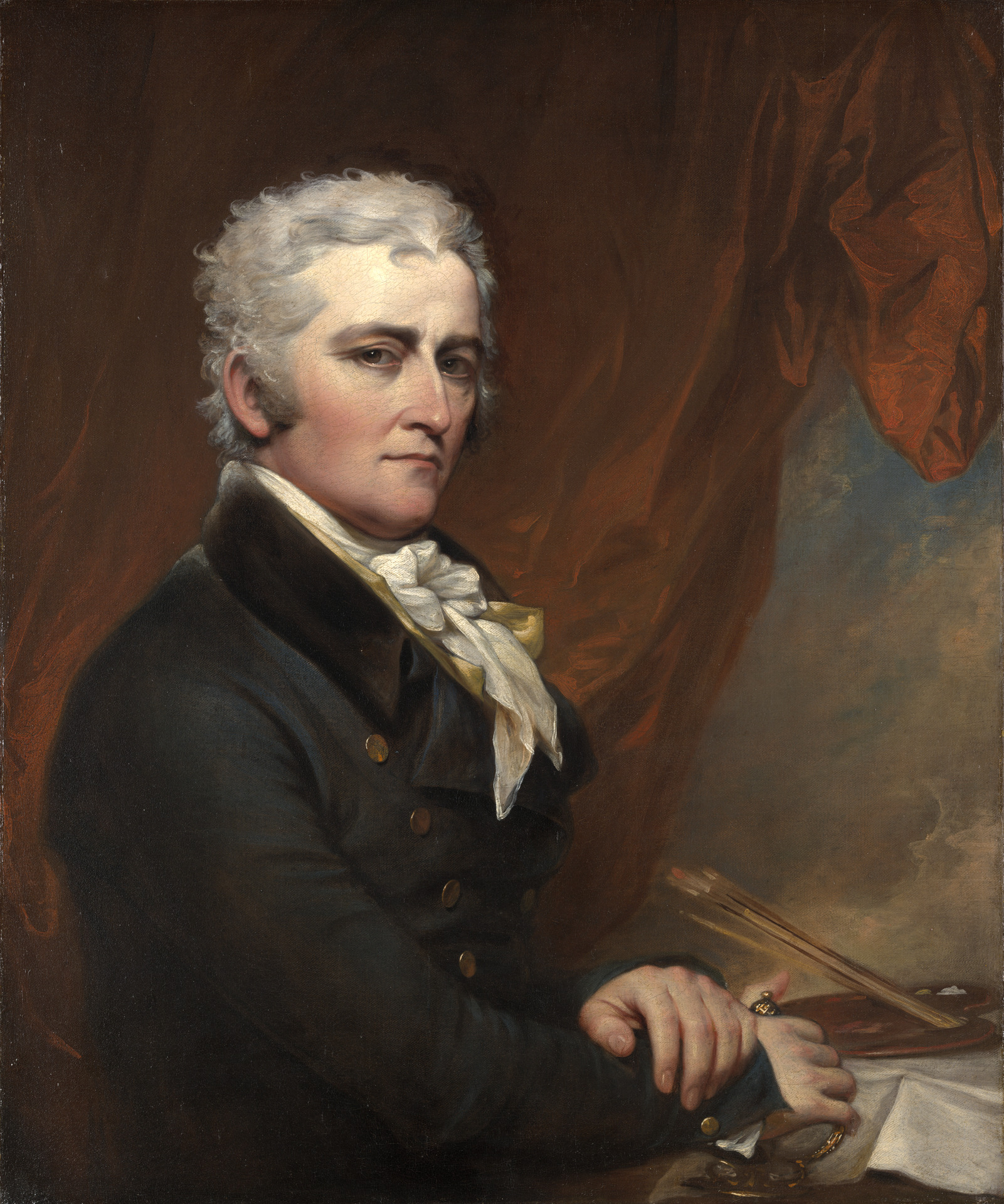
- Self-Portrait, c. 1802
- Born: June 6, 1756; Lebanon, Connecticut, British America
- Died: November 10, 1843 (aged 87); New York City, U.S.
- Resting place: Yale University, New Haven, Connecticut
- Education: Harvard College
- Known for: Painting
- Notable work: Declaration of Independence (painted 1817–1819)

John Trumbull (June 6, 1756 – November 10, 1843) was an American painter and military officer best known for his historical paintings of the American Revolutionary War, of which he was a veteran. He has been called the "Painter of the Revolution". Trumbull's Declaration of Independence (1817), one of his four paintings that hang in the United States Capitol rotunda, is used on the reverse of the current United States two-dollar bill.

== Early life and education ==
Trumbull was born in Lebanon in Connecticut Colony in 1756, to Jonathan Trumbull and Faith (née Robinson) Trumbull. His father served as governor of Connecticut from 1769 to 1784. Both sides of his family were descended from early Puritan settlers of Connecticut.

He had two older brothers, Joseph Trumbull, the first commissary general of the Continental Army in the Revolutionary War, and Jonathan Trumbull Jr., who became the second Speaker of the House of Representatives.

Trumbull entered the 1771 junior class at Harvard College at age 15 and graduated in 1773. Due to a childhood accident, Trumbull lost the use of one eye, which may have influenced his detailed painting style.

== Career ==
=== American Revolutionary War ===
As a soldier in the American Revolutionary War, Trumbull rendered a particular service at Boston by sketching plans of the British and American lines and works. He witnessed the Battle of Bunker Hill. He was appointed second aide-de-camp to General George Washington, and in June 1776, deputy adjutant general to General Horatio Gates. Trumbull resigned from the army in 1777; the cause was reported to be a dispute over the dating of his commission, which would have blocked him from further promotion.

In 1780, a financially struggling Trumbull decided to work as a professional artist and sailed to London, via France where he was introduced to Benjamin Franklin. Trumbull studied under Benjamin West. At West's suggestion, Trumbull painted small pictures of the American Revolutionary War and miniature portraits. He painted about 250 such portraits in his lifetime. He also painted the portrait of Washington from memory during this time.

==== Arrested in Britain ====
On September 23, 1780, British Major John André, the head of Britain's intelligence operations in North America, was captured by American forces and hanged as a spy on October 2. After news of André's execution reached England outrage flared and Trumbull was arrested for treason, since he was known to be a former Continental Army officer who held a similar rank to André. Trumbull was imprisoned for seven months at Tothill Fields Bridewell in London before being released.

==== Return to America ====
Ostracized from British society, Trumbull returned to the United States upon his release, on a voyage that lasted six months. Arriving in late January 1782, he found employment with his brother David as a commissary agent for the army stationed at New Windsor, New York, during the winter of 1782 and 1783.

=== Postwar years ===
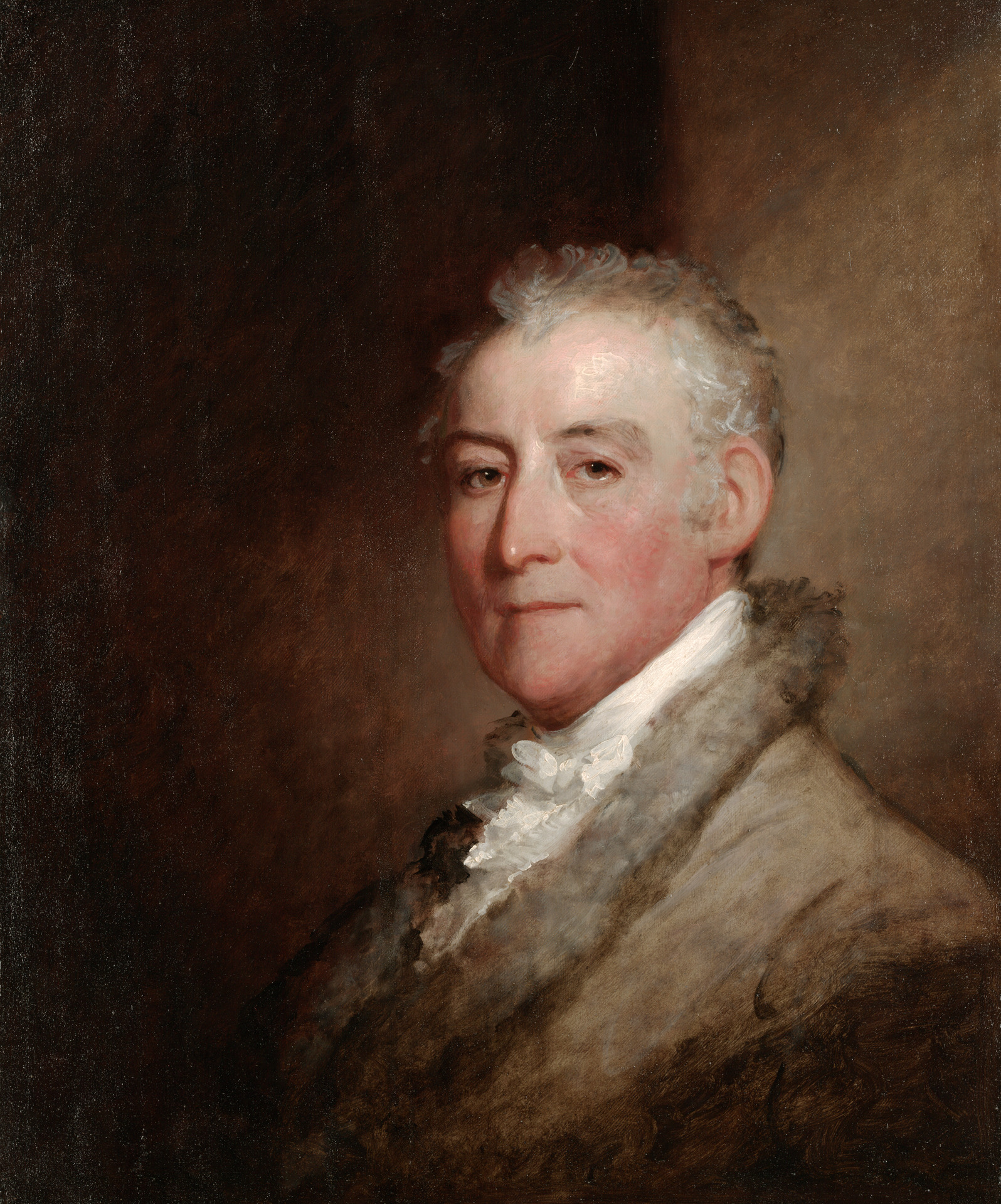
John Trumbull, painted by Gilbert Stuart in 1818

In 1784, following Britain's recognition of United States' sovereignty and independence, Trumbull returned to London to complete his apprenticeship with West. His first major work, The Deputation from the Senate Presenting to Cincinnatus the Command of the Roman Armies, was accepted and displayed by the Royal Academy of Arts in that year. In this work, Trumbull painted Lucius Quinctius Cincinnatus in the likeness of George Washington. The painting's current location is unknown. While working in his studio, Trumbull painted Battle of Bunker Hill and Death of General Montgomery in the Attack on Quebec; both works are now housed at the Yale University Art Gallery in New Haven, Connecticut.

In July 1786, Trumbull traveled to Paris, where he made portrait sketches of French officers, including Surrender of Lord Cornwallis. With assistance from Thomas Jefferson, who was then serving in Paris as the American minister to France, Trumbull began the early composition of the Declaration of Independence. Over the next five years, Trumbull painted small portraits of the 56 signers of the Declaration of Independence, which he later used to piece together a larger painting. If a signer was deceased, Trumbull copied a previous portrait, as he did with Arthur Middleton, whose head position stands out in the painting. While visiting with each signer or their family, Trumbull was always seeking funding and used the occasion to sell subscriptions to engravings that he produced from his paintings of the American Revolution.

While in Paris, Trumbull introduced Jefferson to Italian painter Maria Cosway, and they became lifelong intimate friends. Trumbull's painting of Jefferson, commissioned by Cosway, became widely known and was later engraved by Asher Brown Durand.

Trumbull's Declaration of Independence painting was purchased by the United States Congress, along with three of his other Revolutionary-era portraits, Surrender of General Burgoyne, Surrender of Lord Cornwallis, and General George Washington Resigning His Commission. Each of these portraits now hang in United States Capitol rotunda at the United States Capitol in Washington, D.C. Congress reportedly authorized only funds sufficient to purchase these four paintings.

Trumbull completed several other paintings related to the Revolution:

- Death of General Warren at the Battle of Bunker's Hill, one version of which is now housed at the Boston Museum of Fine Arts);
- Death of General Montgomery in the Attack on Quebec
- Capture of the Hessians at Trenton
- George Washington at Trenton, New Jersey, on the night of January 2, 1777. Trumbull considered this portrait "the best certainly of those which I painted".
- Death of General Mercer at the Battle of Princeton
- Washington at Verplanck's Point, which Trumbull presented as a gift in 1790 to Martha Washington
- George Washington, commissioned by the City of New York in 1790
- The Sortie Made by the Garrison of Gibraltar, 1789, which was once owned by the Boston Athenaeum and is now housed at the Metropolitan Museum of Art in New York City.

== Middle years ==
Trumbull's portraits also include full lengths of General Washington (1790) and George Clinton (1791), now held in New York City Hall. New York City Hall also hangs Trumbull's portrait of Mayor Richard Varick, who commissioned the 1790 portrait of Washington. New York also bought his full-length paintings of Alexander Hamilton (1805, the source of the face on the $10 bill) and John Jay. Trumbull was elected a Fellow of the American Academy of Arts and Sciences in 1791 and elected as a member of the American Philosophical Society in 1792.

He painted portraits of John Adams (1797), Jonathan Trumbull, and Rufus King (1800); Timothy Dwight and Stephen Van Rensselaer (both at Yale), Alexander Hamilton (one in the Metropolitan Museum of Art and one in the Boston Museum of Fine Arts, both taken from Ceracchi's bust), a self-portrait (1833), a full-length of Washington, held at Charleston, South Carolina; a full-length of Washington in uniform, General George Washington at Trenton, (1792, at Yale); and portraits of President and Mrs. Washington (1794), in the National Museum of American History.

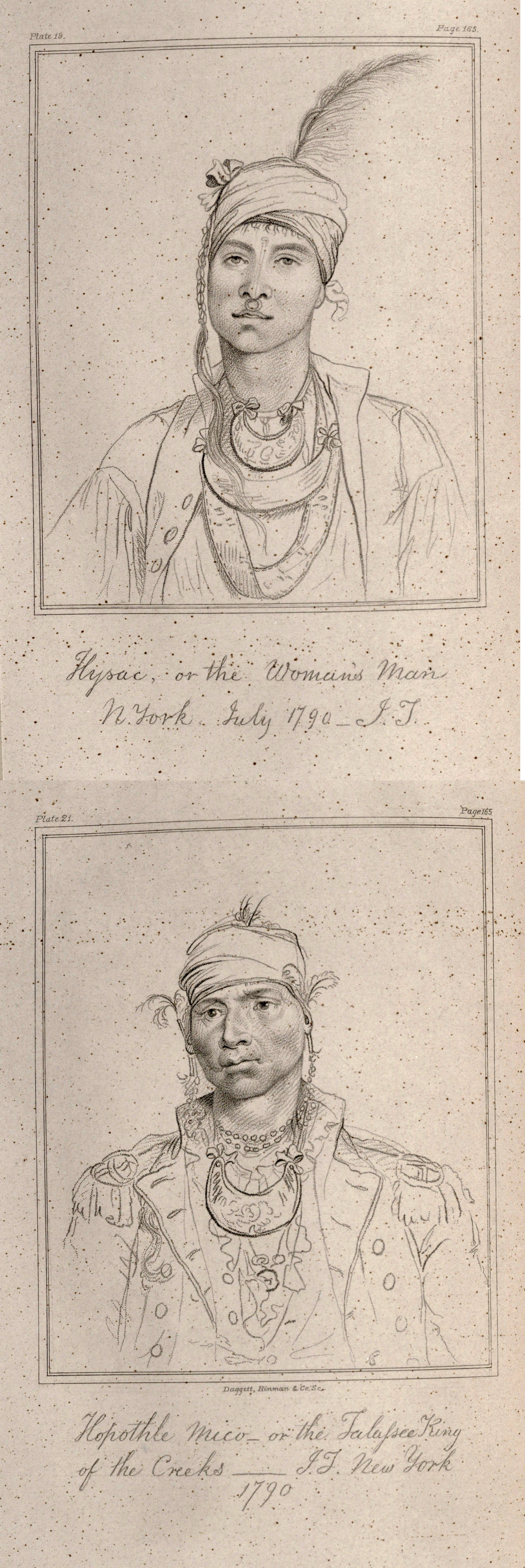
Sketches of Creek leaders, Hysac, or The Woman's Man, and Hopothle Mico, or, The Talassee King of the Creeks, made by John Trumbull in 1790 during negotiations for the Treaty of New York (Yale Beinecke J18 T771 841)

Trumbull himself was painted by Gilbert Stuart and many others.

In 1794, Trumbull acted as secretary to John Jay in London during the negotiation of the treaty with Great Britain, which largely settled the boundary with Canada and began cotton export to the country. In 1796, he was appointed by the commissioners sent by the two countries as the fifth member of a commission charged with carrying out the seventh article of the Jay Treaty, which mediated claims by American and British merchants and the opposing government stemming from actions that occurred during the war. Shortly after the end of Trumbull's service on this commission, he traveled to Stuttgart to pick up the completed engraving of the Battle of Bunker's Hill. On the return trip, he passed through Paris and carried the first dispatch from the XYZ Affair out of France.

Trumbull later encountered hard times during which he was failing to sell his paintings individually. In 1831, he sold a series of 28 paintings and 60 miniature portraits to Yale University for an annuity of $1,000. After many years of trying to create income from his paintings, he had finally found a way to sustain himself from his art. This is by far the largest single collection of his works. The collection was originally housed in a neoclassical art gallery designed by Trumbull on Yale's Old Campus, along with portraits by other artists.

== Later years ==
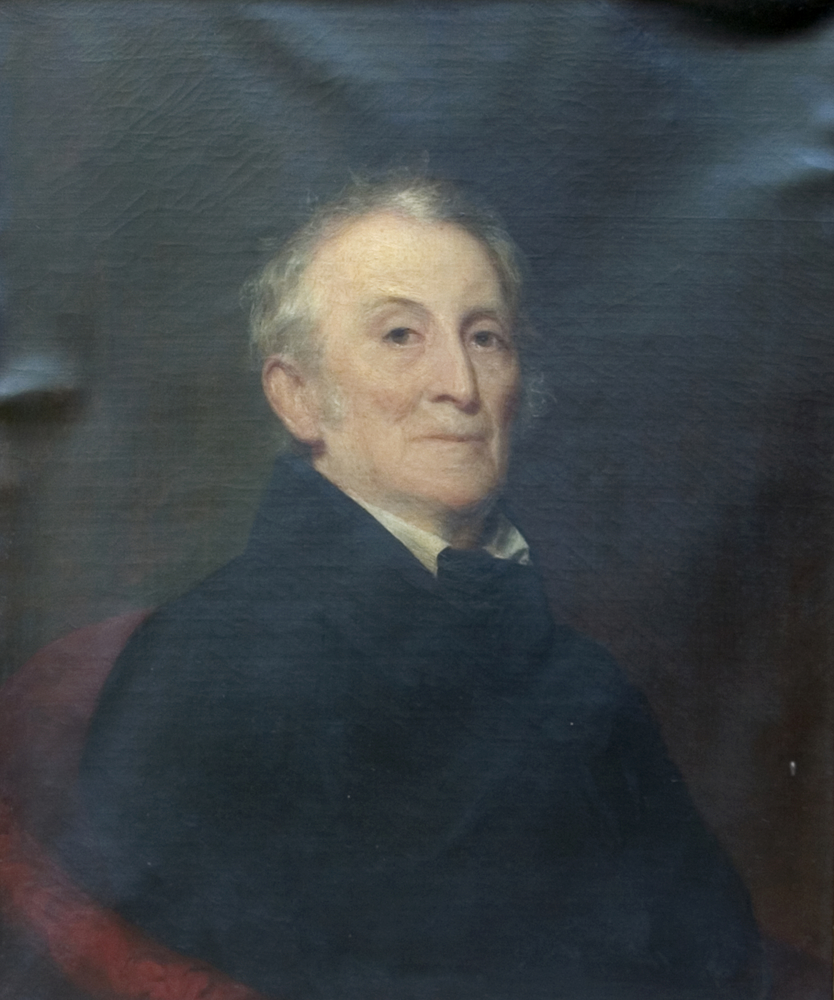
Trumbull, painted by James Frothingham

Trumbull was appointed president of the American Academy of the Fine Arts in New York City, serving from 1816 to 1836. Emphasizing classical traditions, Trumbull did not get along with the students. At the same time, his painting skills declined. In 1825, many of the students withdrew, founding the National Academy of Design. Unable to accommodate to changing tastes, the American Academy later closed in 1839 after a second fire destroyed its collections.

Trumbull wrote his autobiography, which he published in 1841. He died in New York City at the age of 87 on November 10, 1843.

== Legacy and honors ==
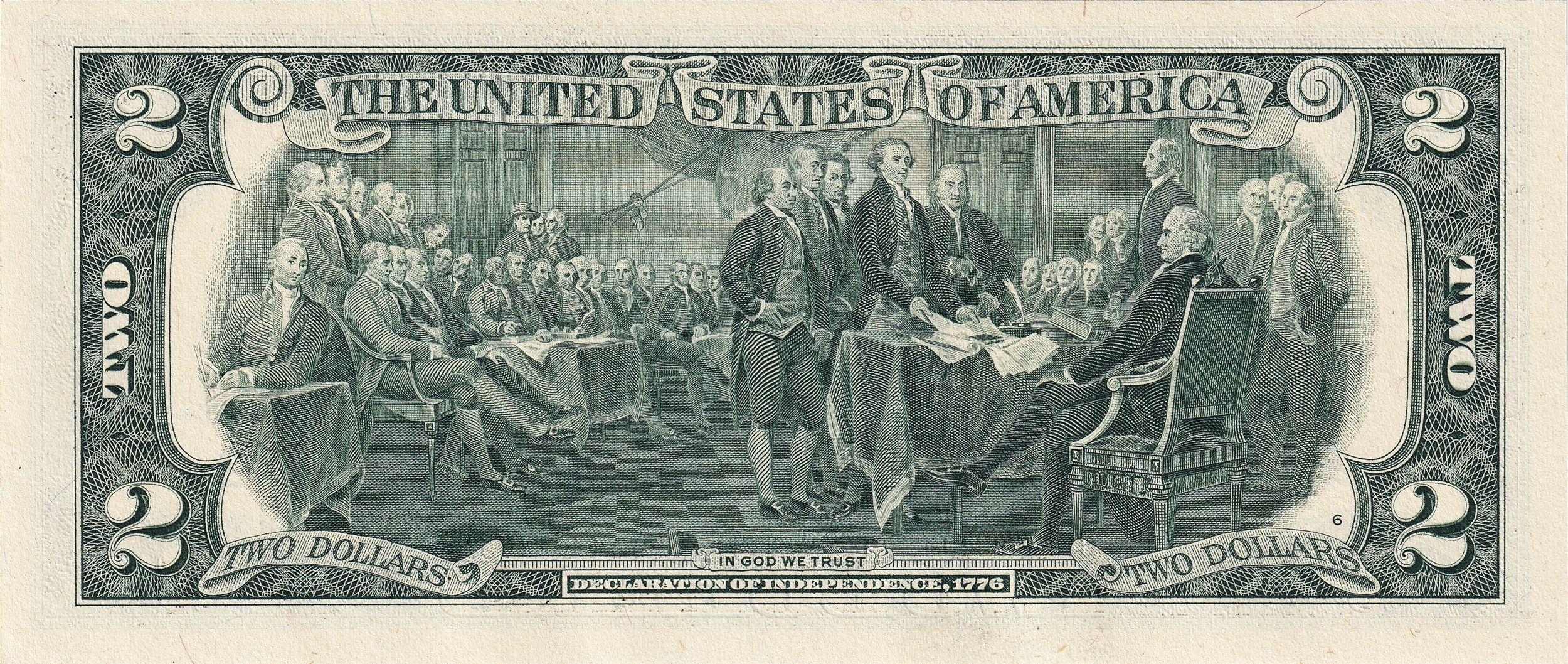
Reverse of U.S. two-dollar bill, featuring Trumbull's Declaration of Independence

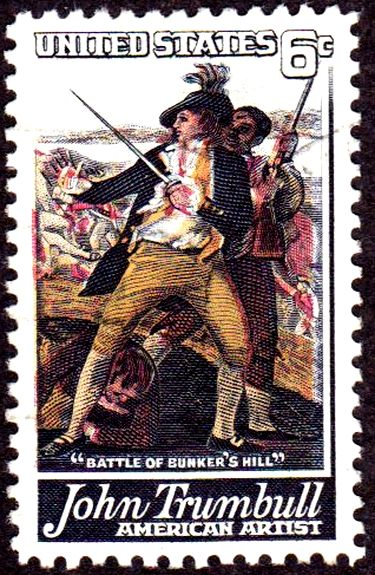
Trumbull commemorative postage stamp, 1968

- Trumbull was originally interred (along with his wife) beneath the Art Gallery at Yale University, which he had designed. In 1867, the collection of his works was moved to the newly built Street Hall. His wife and his remains were reinterred on those grounds. The Trumbull Gallery was later razed.
- 1965, the John Trumbull Birthplace in Lebanon, Connecticut, was declared a National Historic Landmark.
- 1968, a John Trumbull commemorative postage stamp was printed.

== In popular culture ==
- Actor Buzz Bovshow played John Trumbull in the television miniseries John Adams.
- "No John Trumbull" is a deleted song from the musical Hamilton.

== Paintings ==
- The Death of General Warren at the Battle of Bunker's Hill, June 17, 1775
- The Death of General Montgomery in the Attack on Quebec, December 31, 1775
- Declaration of Independence
- The Capture of the Hessians at Trenton, December 26, 1776
- The Death of General Mercer at the Battle of Princeton, January 3, 1777
- The Surrender of General Burgoyne at Saratoga
- The Surrender of Cornwallis at Yorktown
- General George Washington Resigning His Commission
- Portraits of George Washington, John Adams and Alexander Hamilton
- The Death of Aemilius Paullus at the Battle of Cannae
- The Sortie Made by the Garrison of Gibraltar
- Self-portrait
- Portrait of Josiah Bartlett
- Jonathan Trumbull, Jr. (1740–1809) with Mrs. Trumbull (Eunice Backus) (1749–1826) and Faith Trumbull (1769–1846)

== Gallery ==
=== Historic events ===
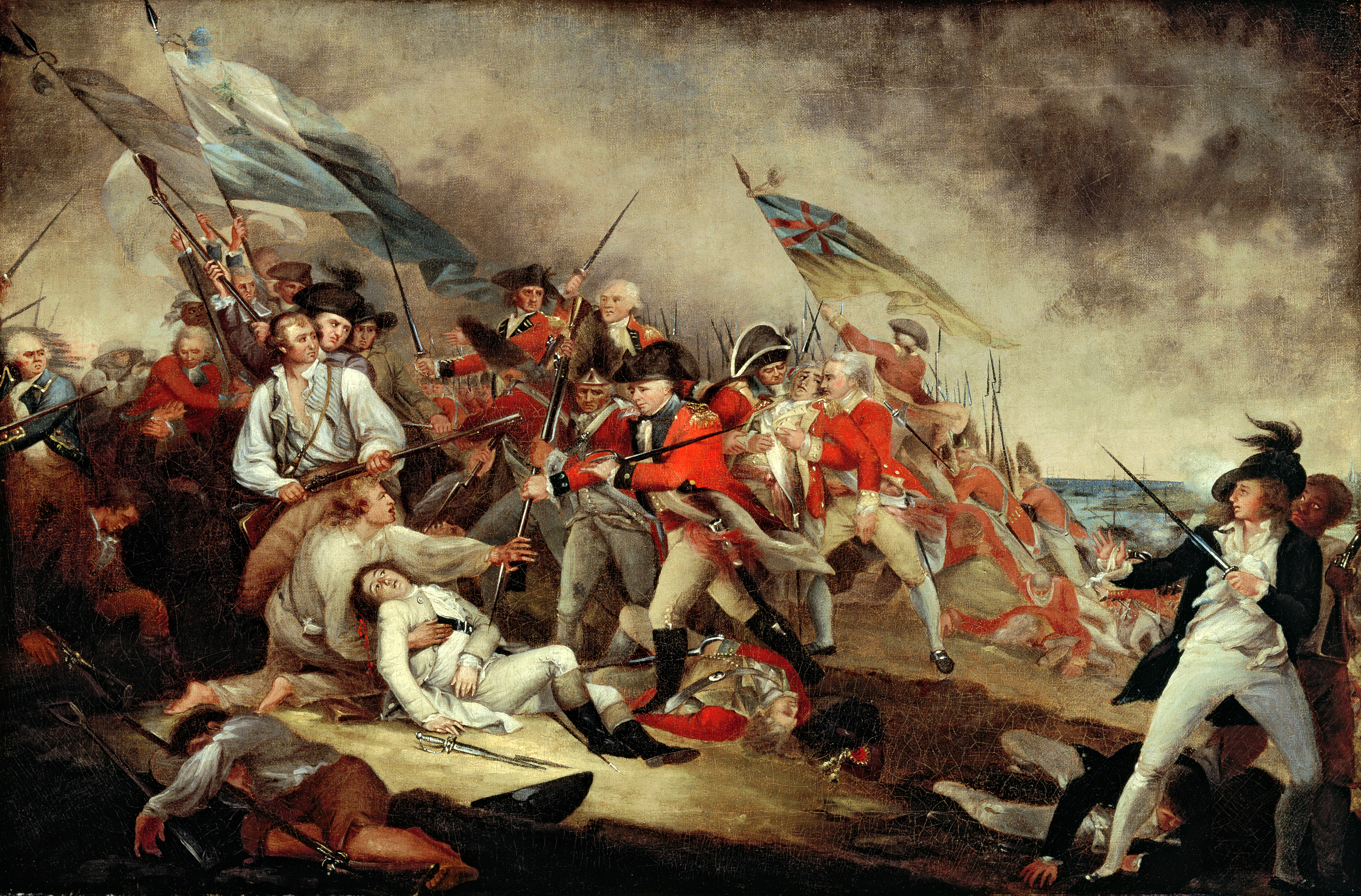
The Death of General Warren at the Battle of Bunker's Hill, June 17, 1775 (event 1775, painted 1786)

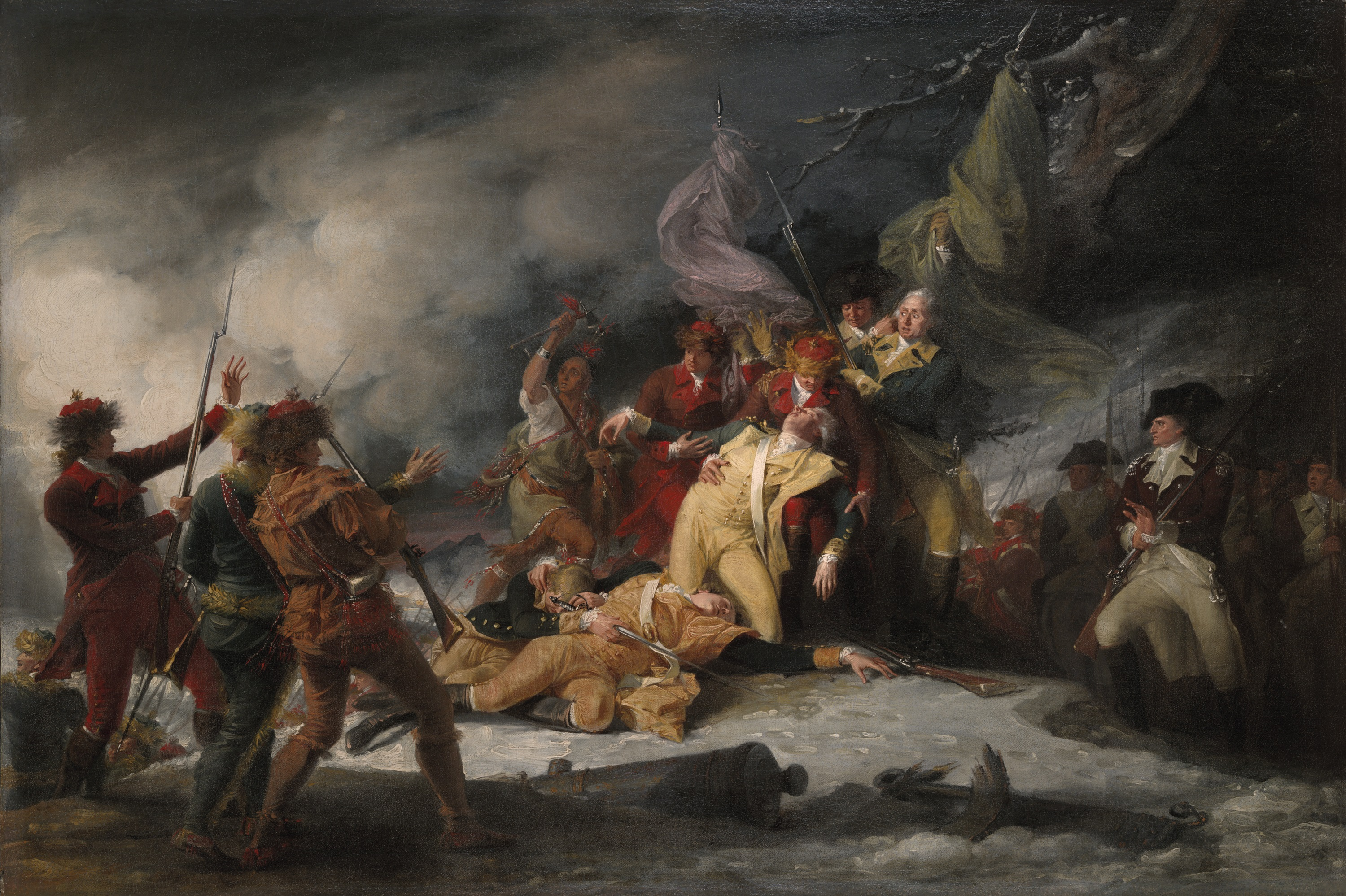
The Death of General Montgomery in the Attack on Quebec, December 31, 1775 (event 1775, painted 1786)

The Declaration of Independence (event 1776, painted 1819)

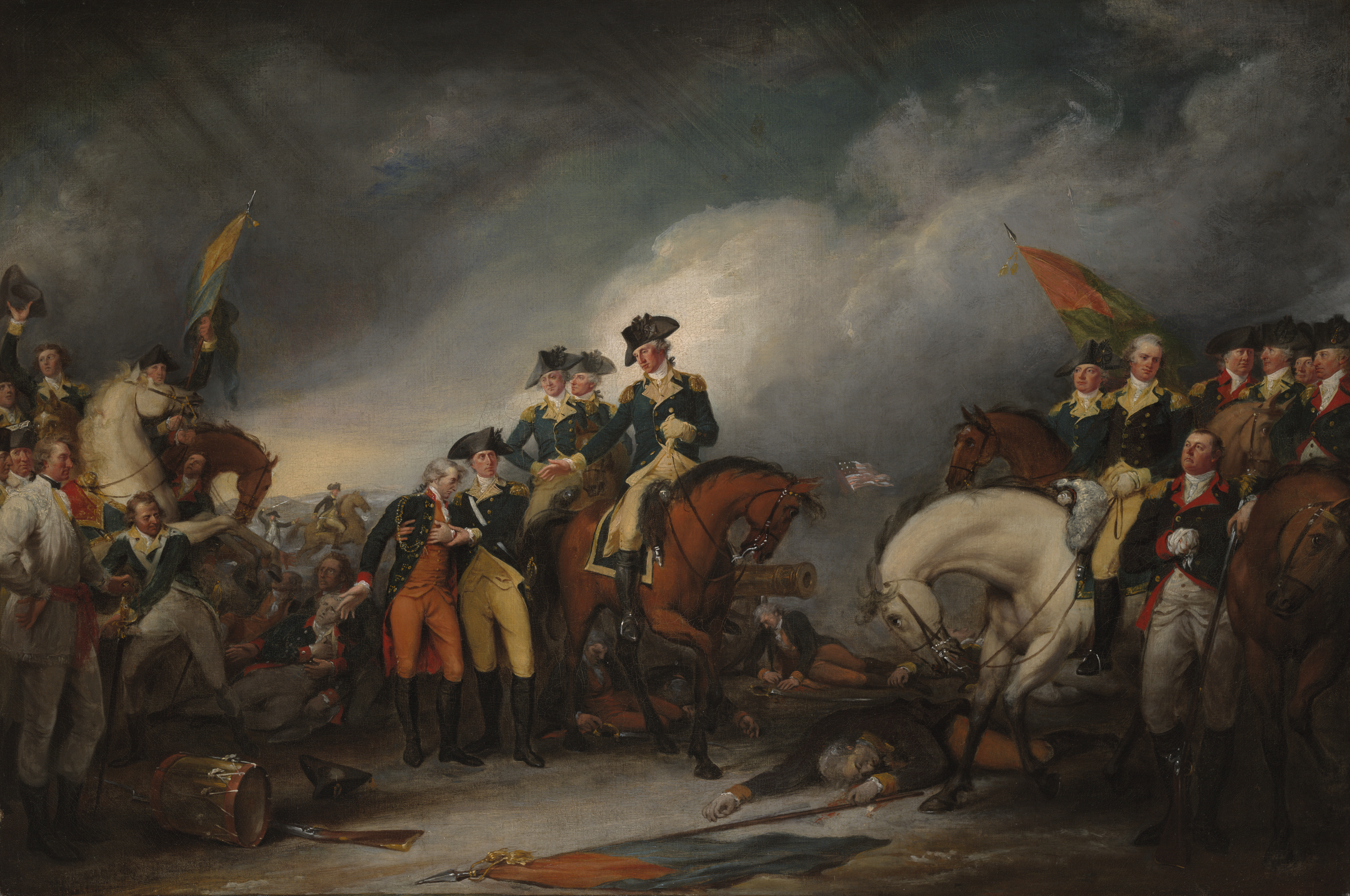
The Capture of the Hessians at Trenton, December 26, 1776 (event 1776, painted 1786–1828)

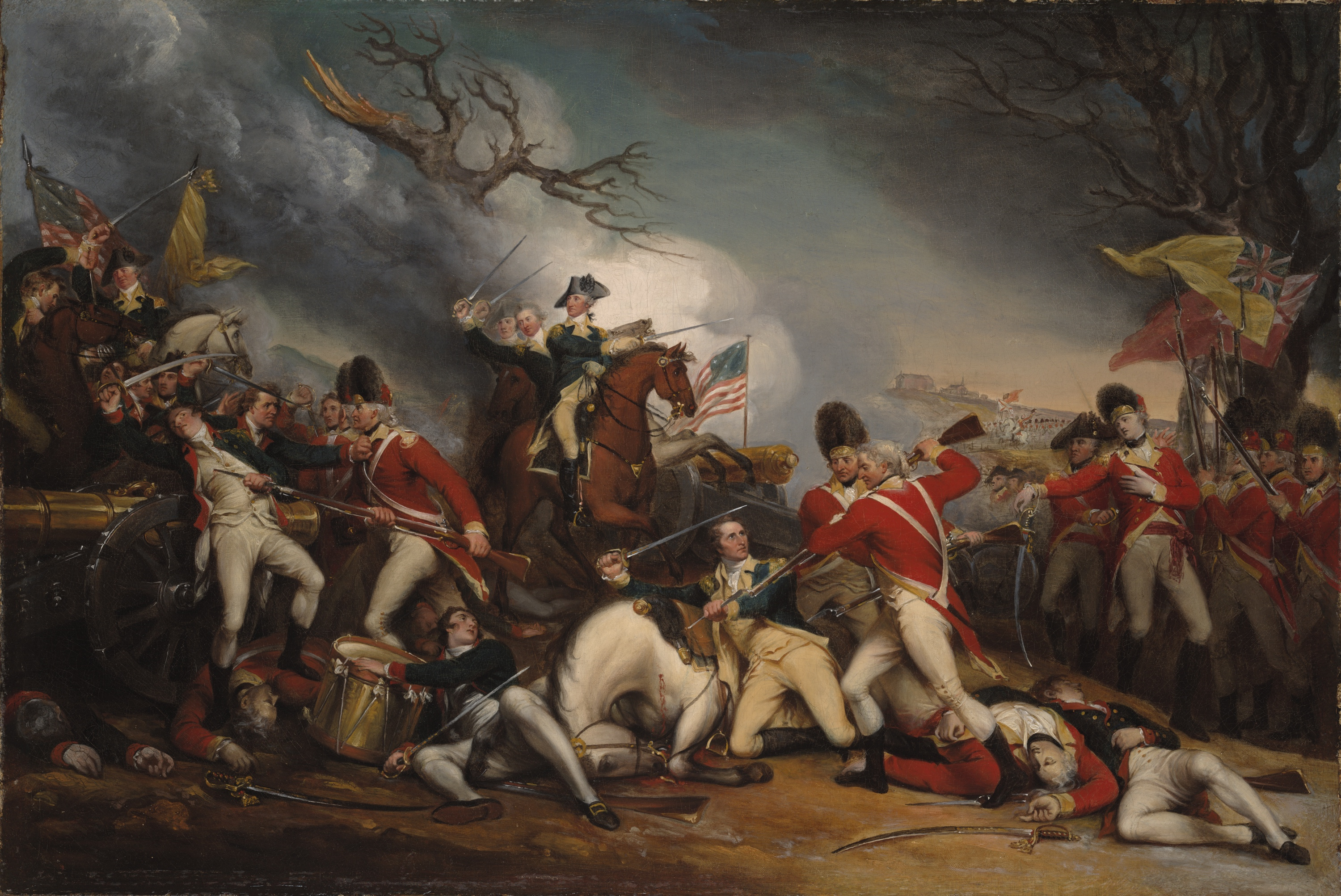
The Death of General Mercer at the Battle of Princeton, January 3, 1777 (event 1777, c. 1787–c. 1831)

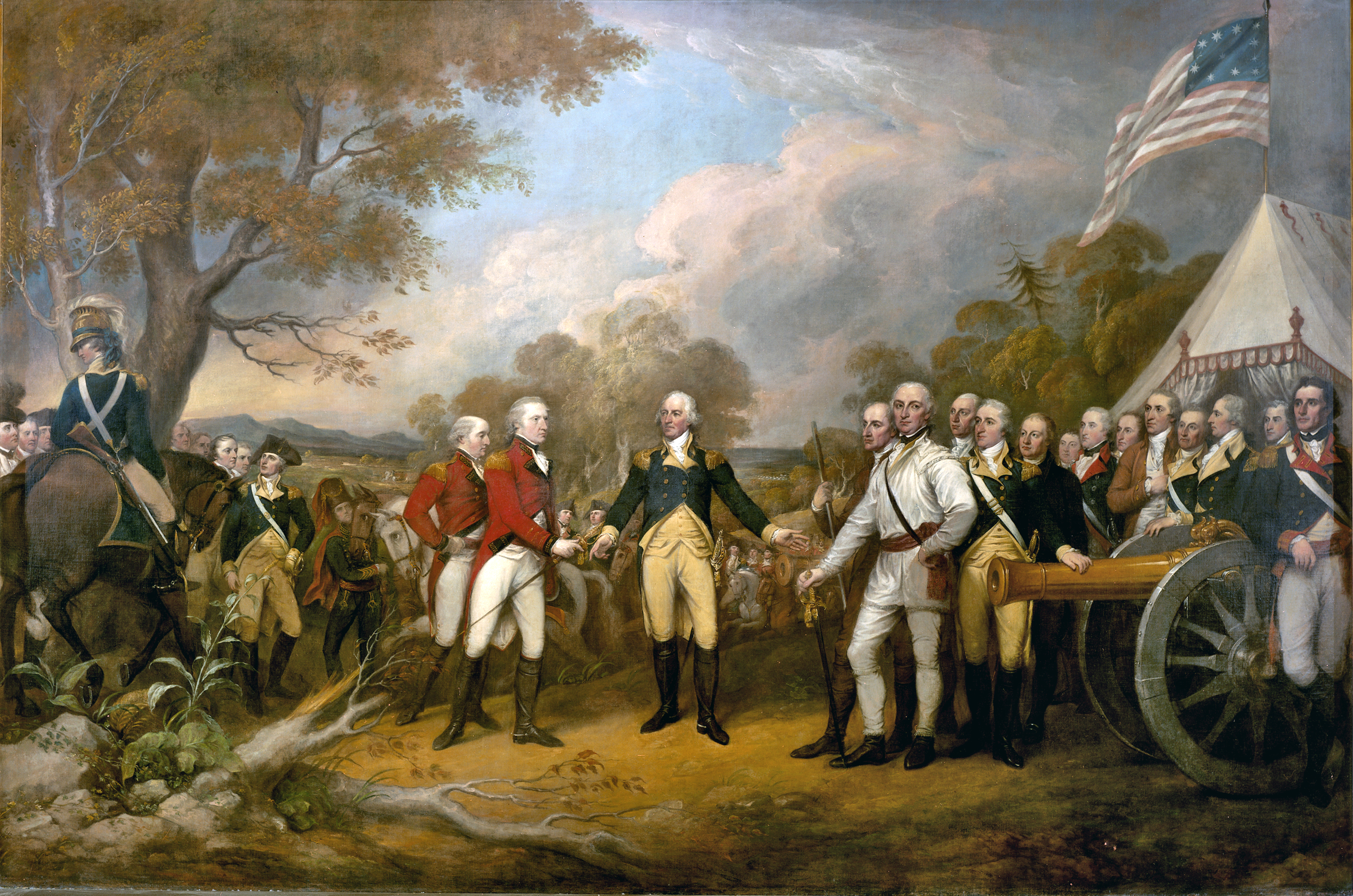
Surrender of General Burgoyne (event 1777, painted 1821)

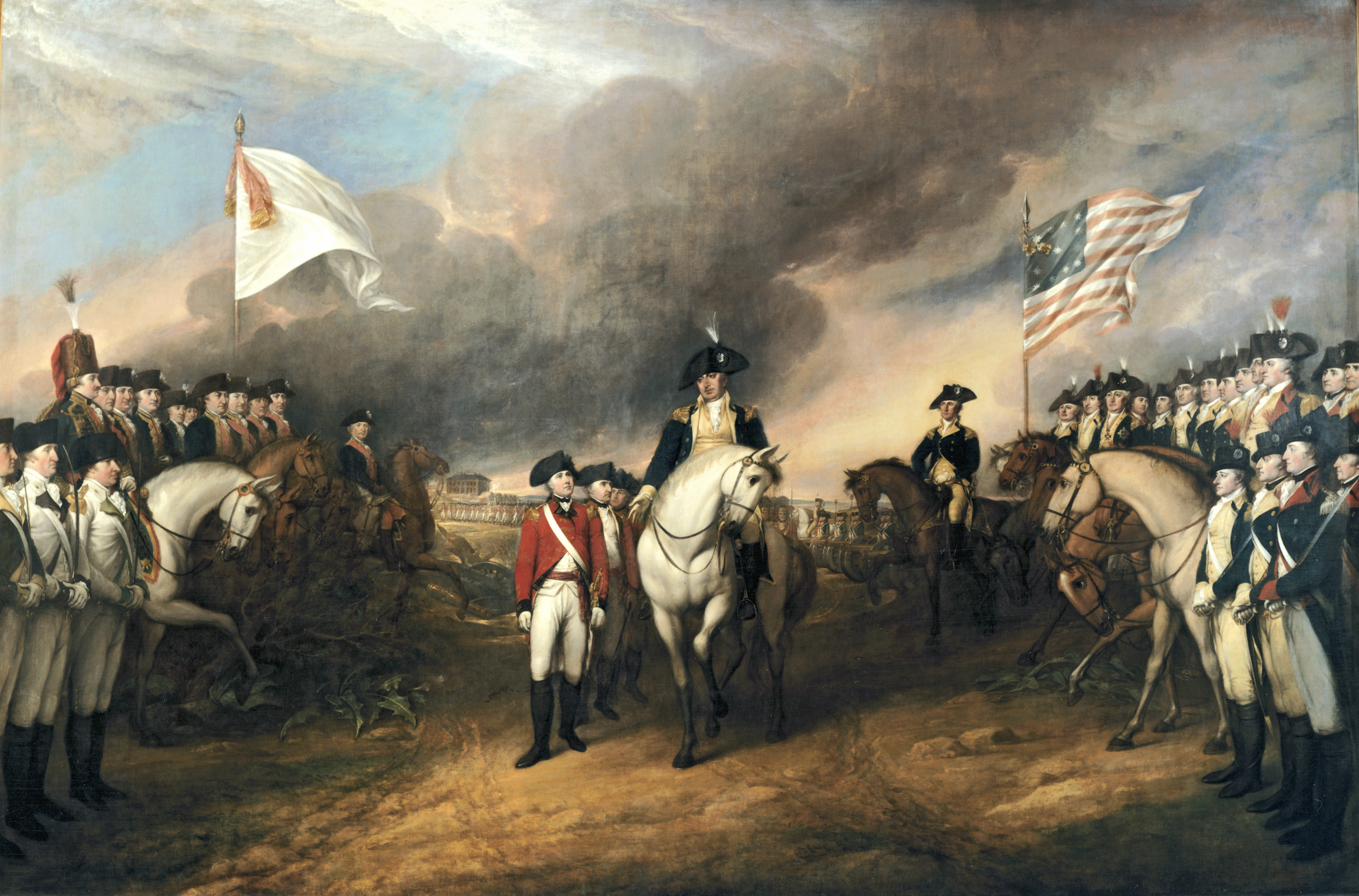
Surrender of Lord Cornwallis (event 1781, painted 1820)

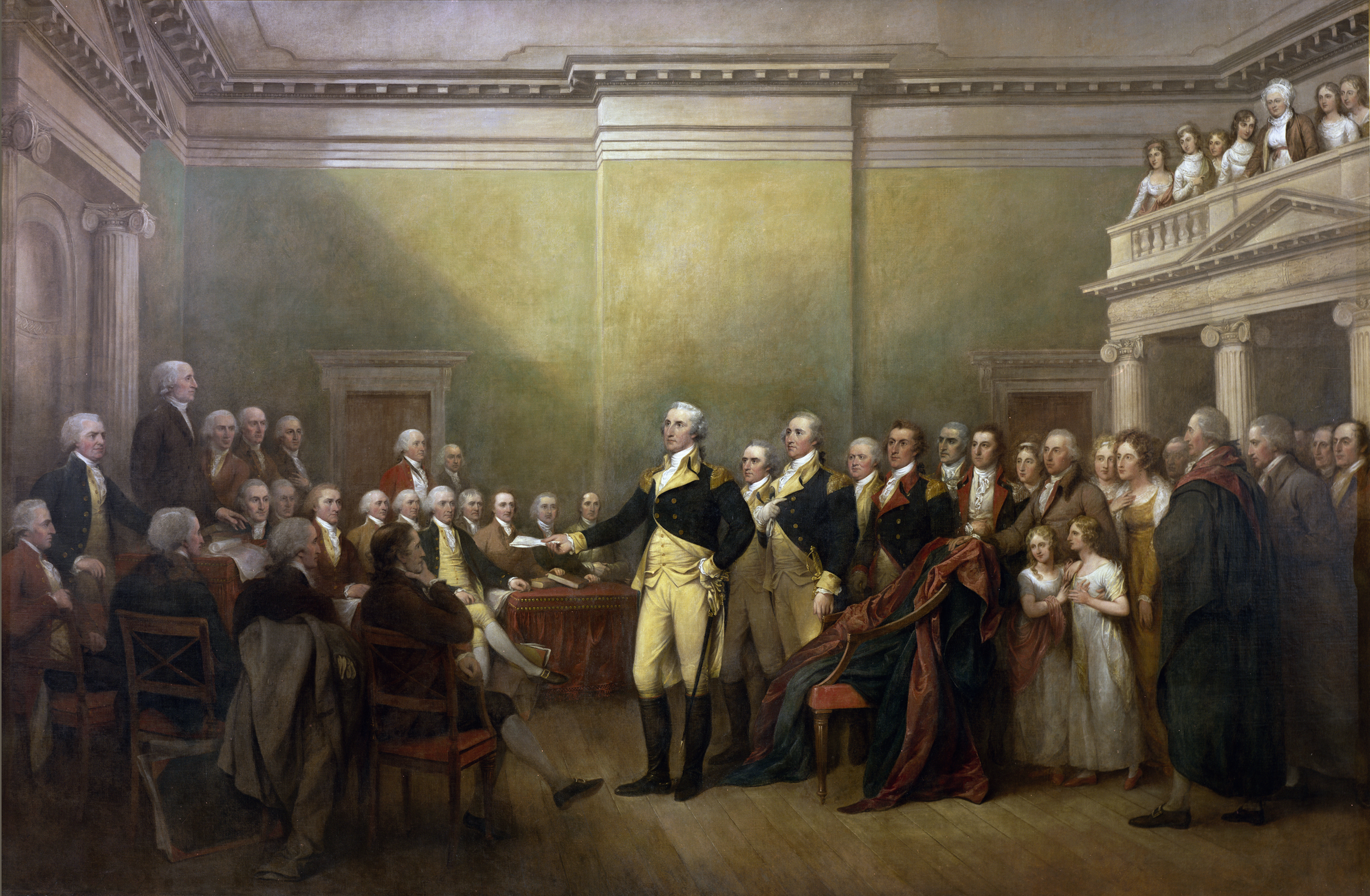
General George Washington Resigning His Commission (event 1783, painted 1824)

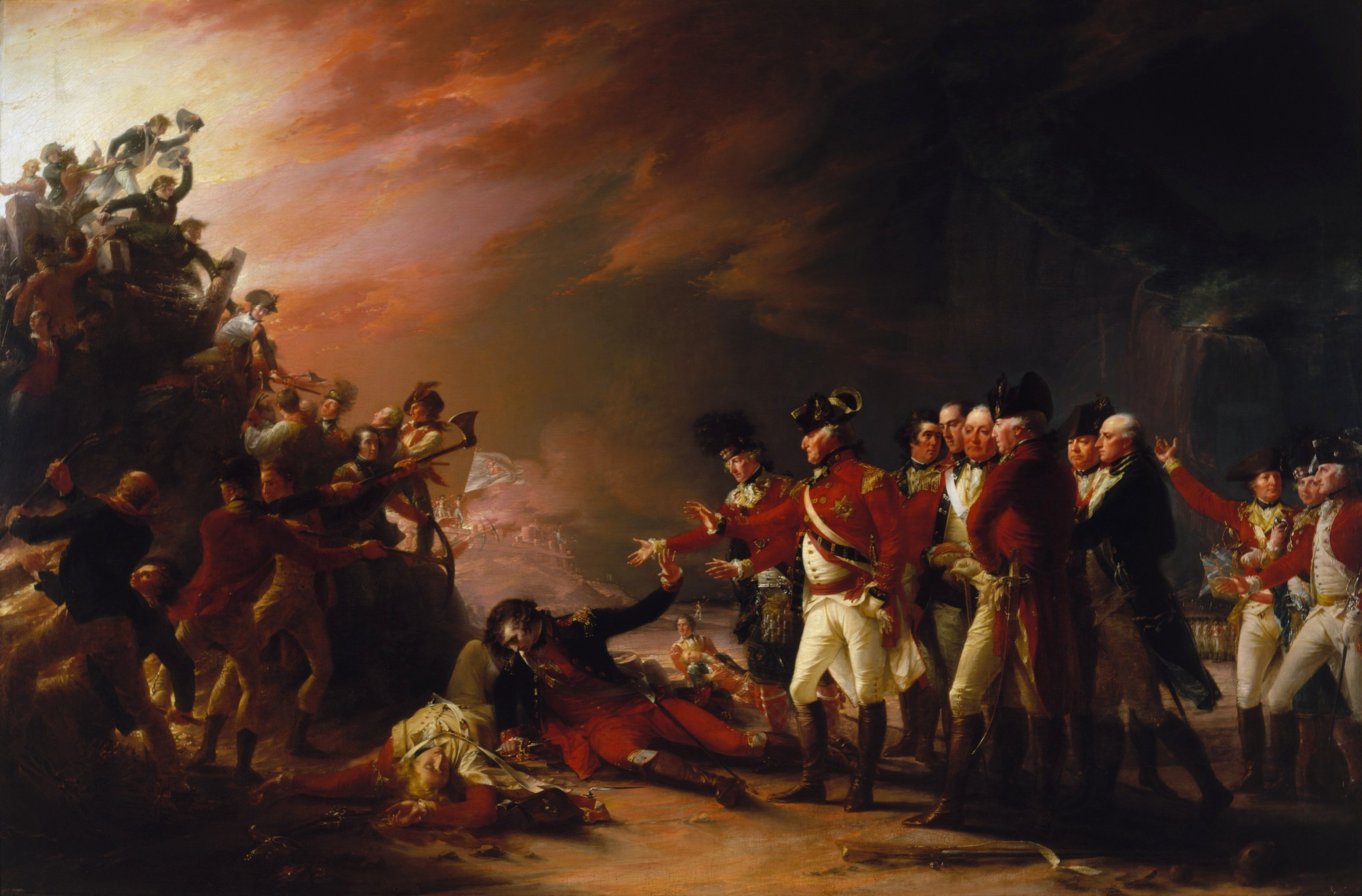
The Sortie Made by the Garrison of Gibraltar (1789)

=== Portraits ===
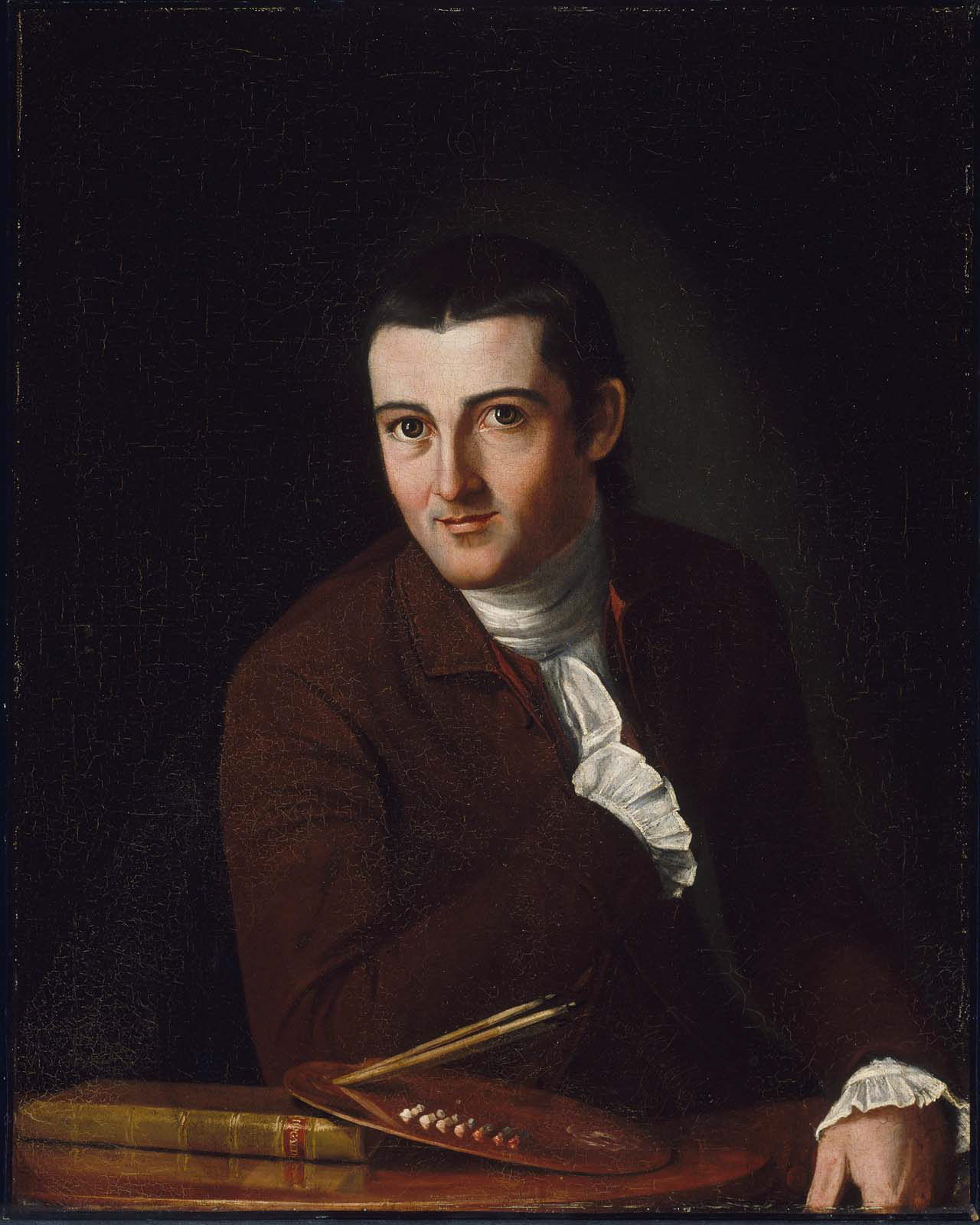
Self-portrait, 1777

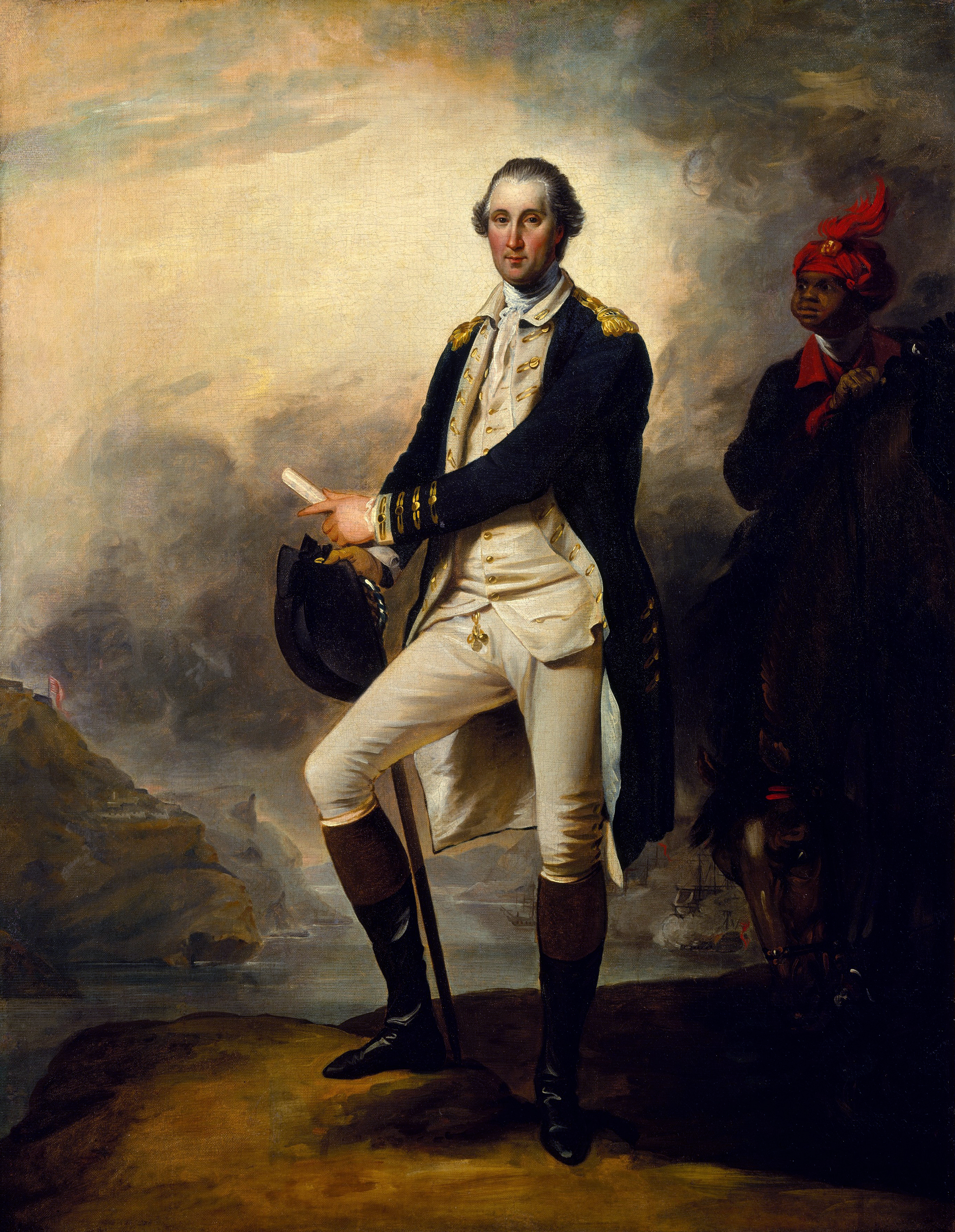
George Washington, 1780

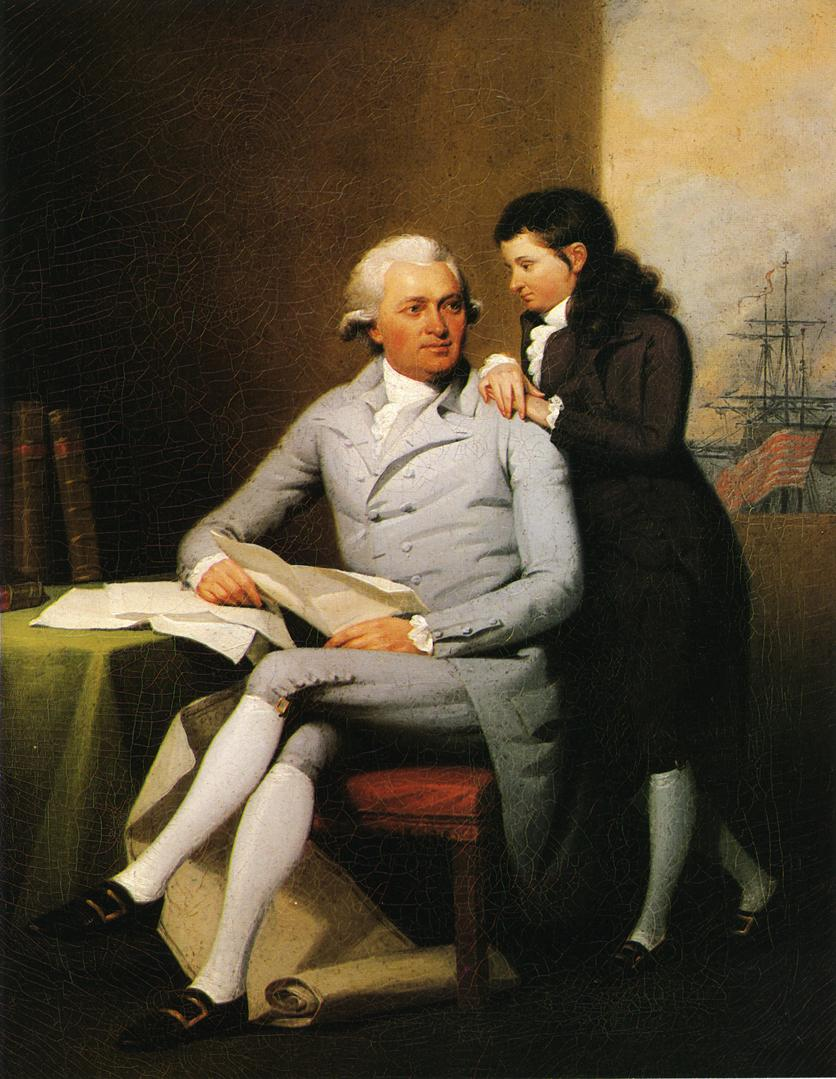
Jeremiah Wadsworth and Daniel Wadsworth, 1784

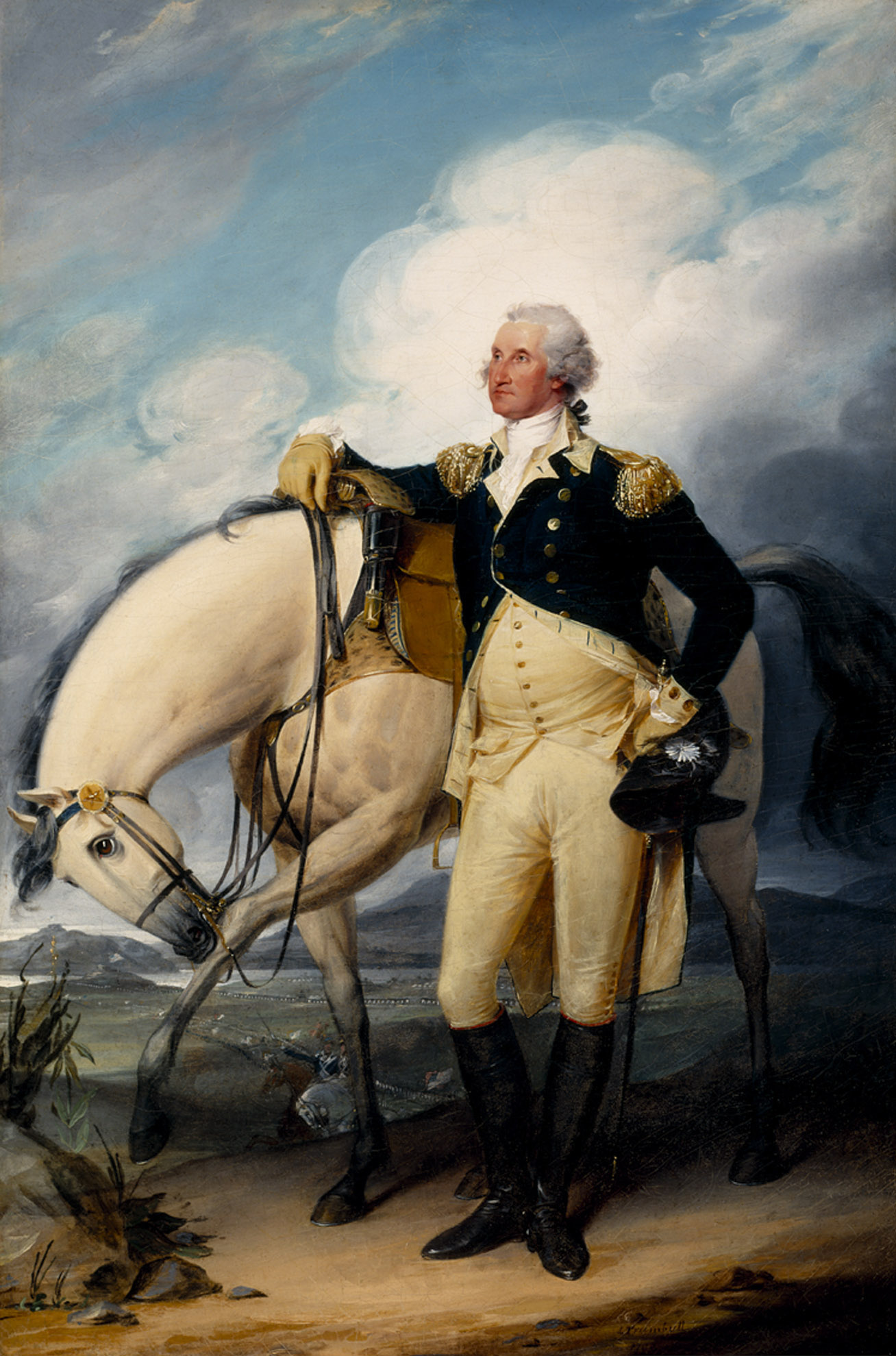
Washington at Verplanck's Point, 1790

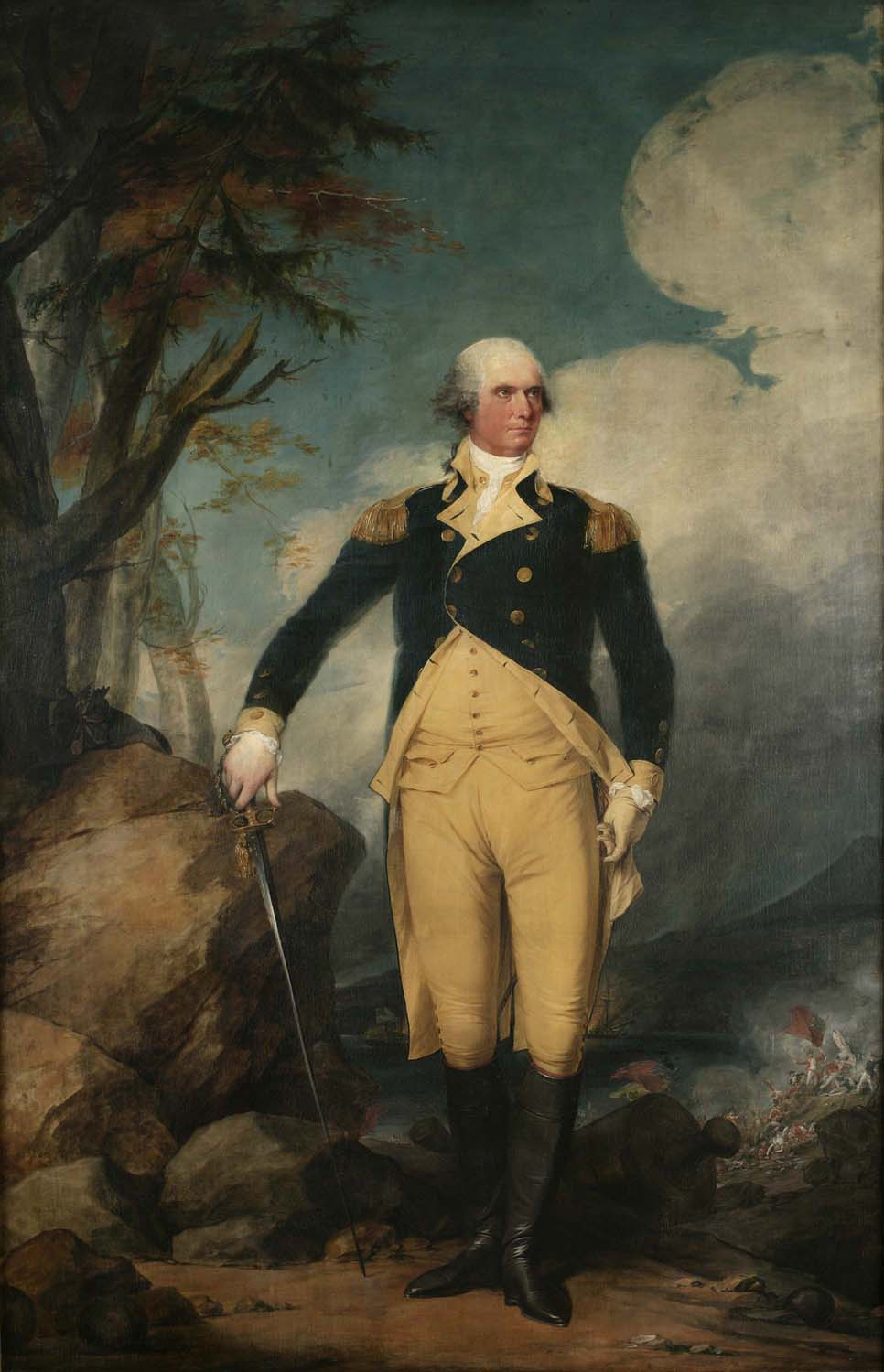
George Clinton, 1791

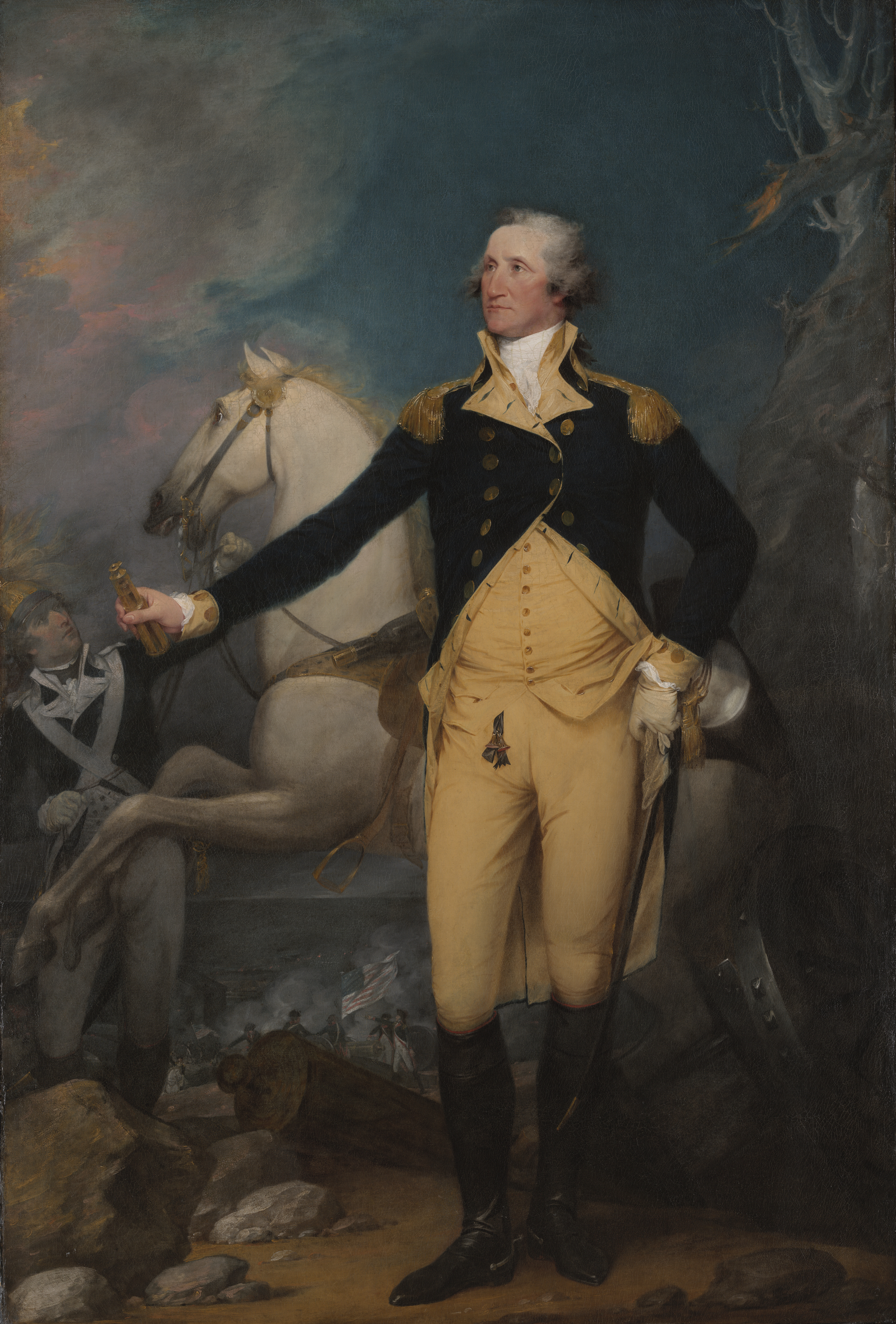
General George Washington at Trenton, 1792

Alexander Hamilton, 1792

Alexander Hamilton, 1792

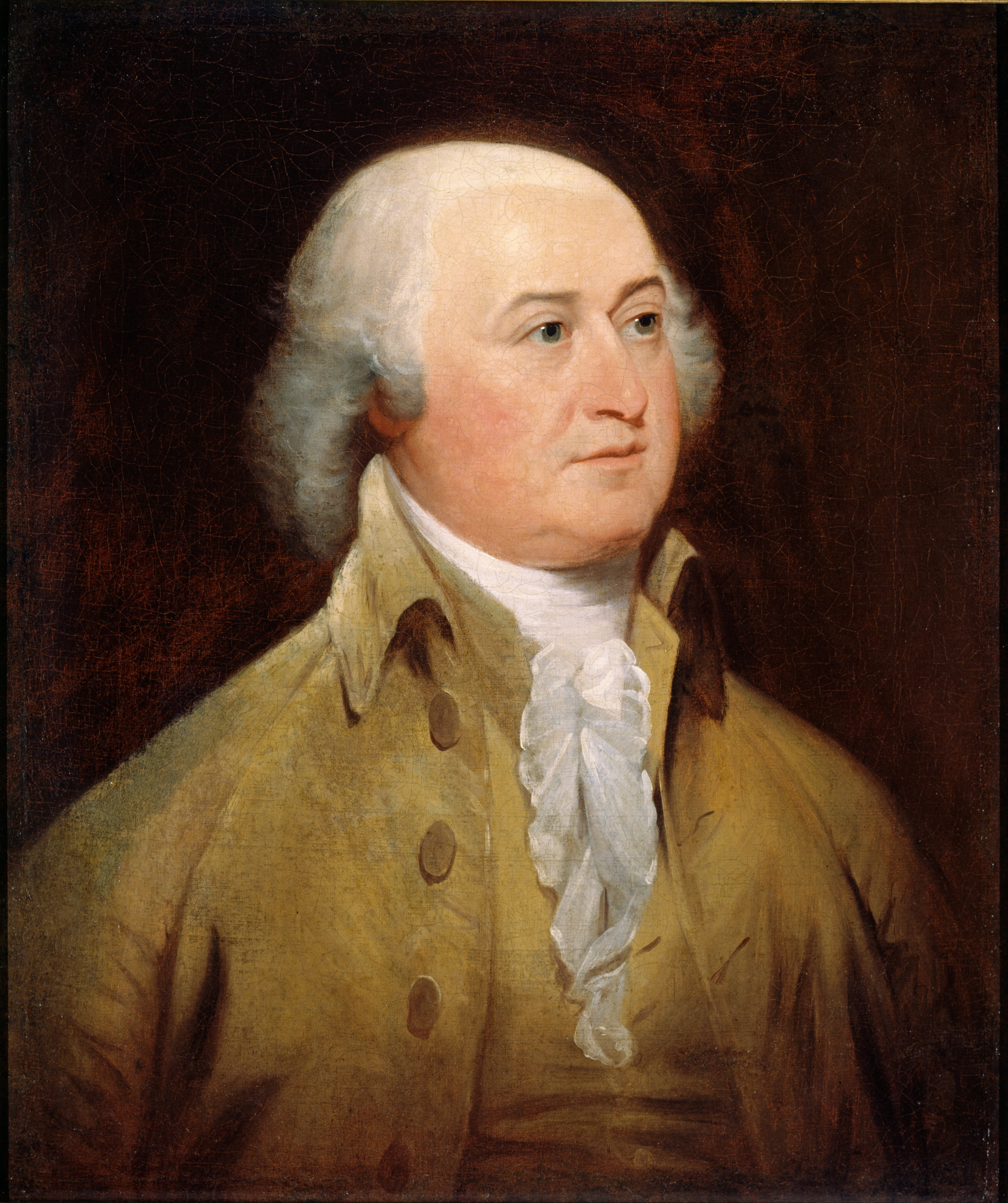
Portrait of John Adams, 1793

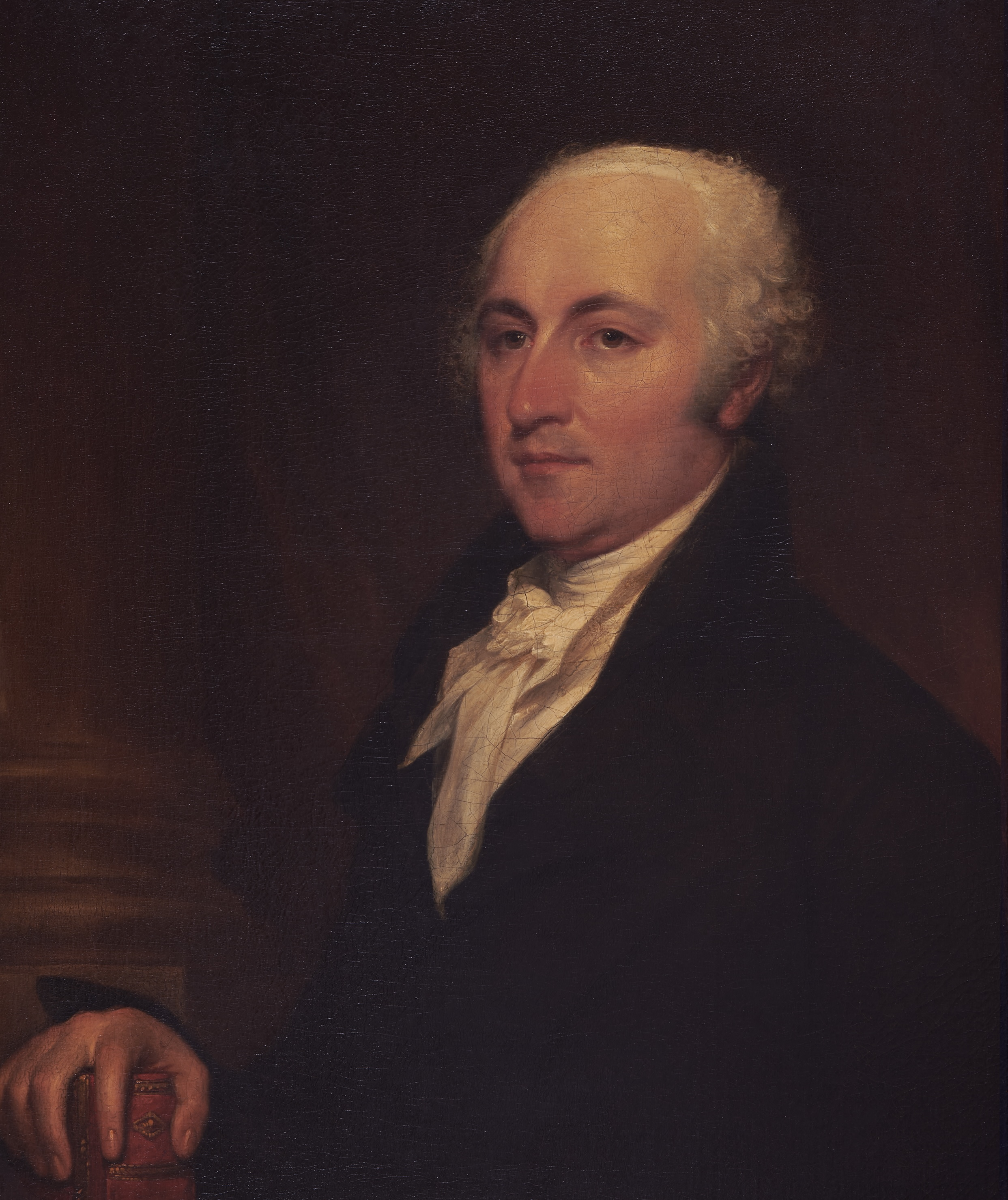
Rufus King, 1800

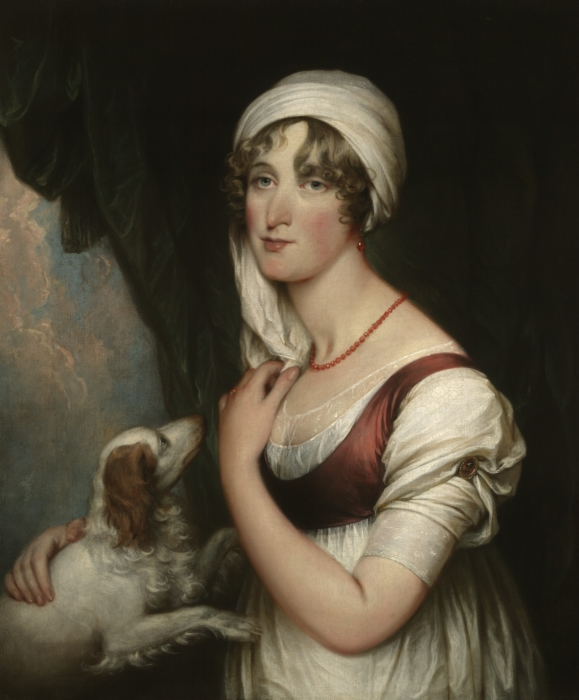
Mrs Sarah Trumbull with a spaniel, 1802

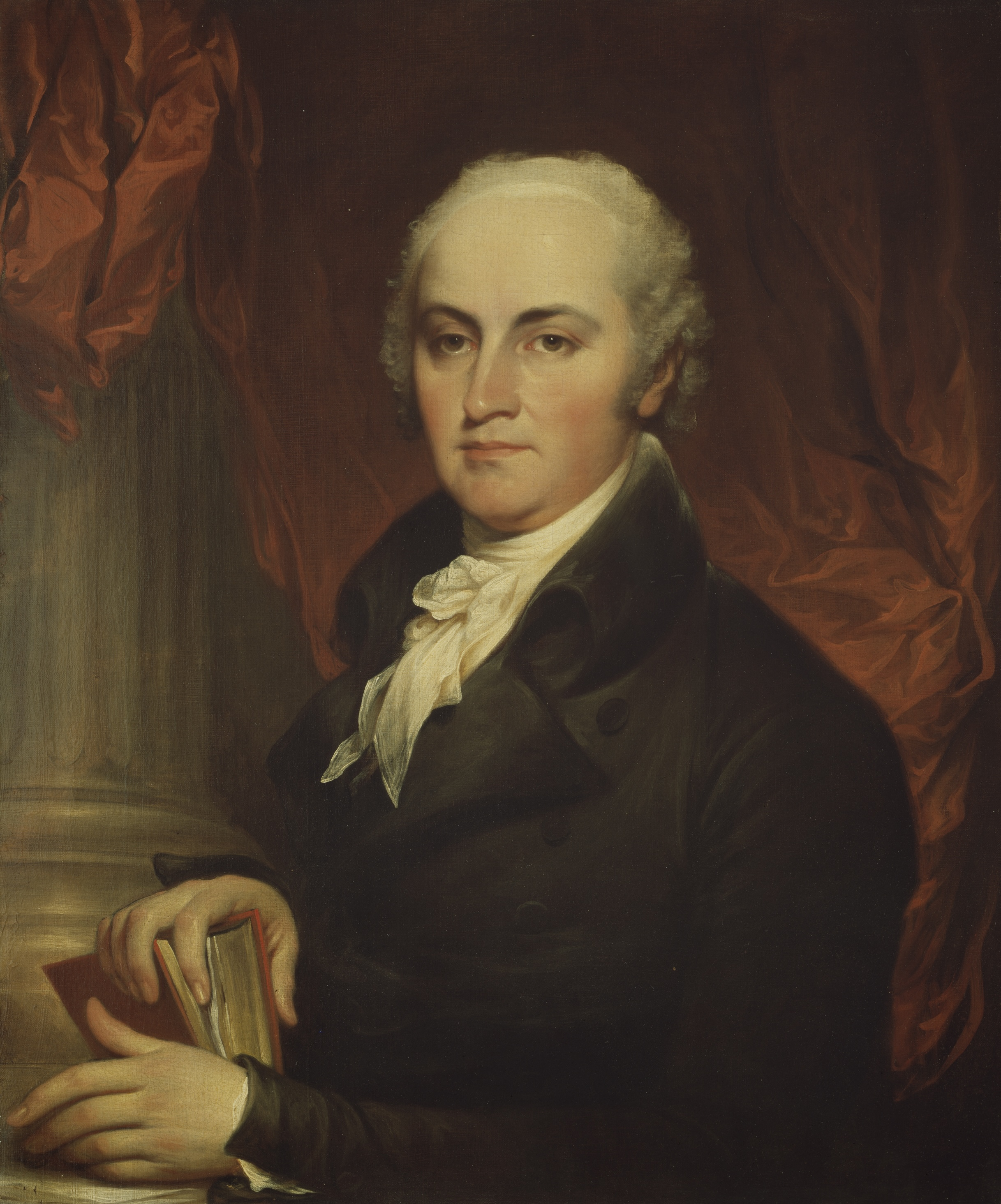
Christopher Gore, 1802–1804

Richard Varick, 1805

=== Portrait miniatures ===
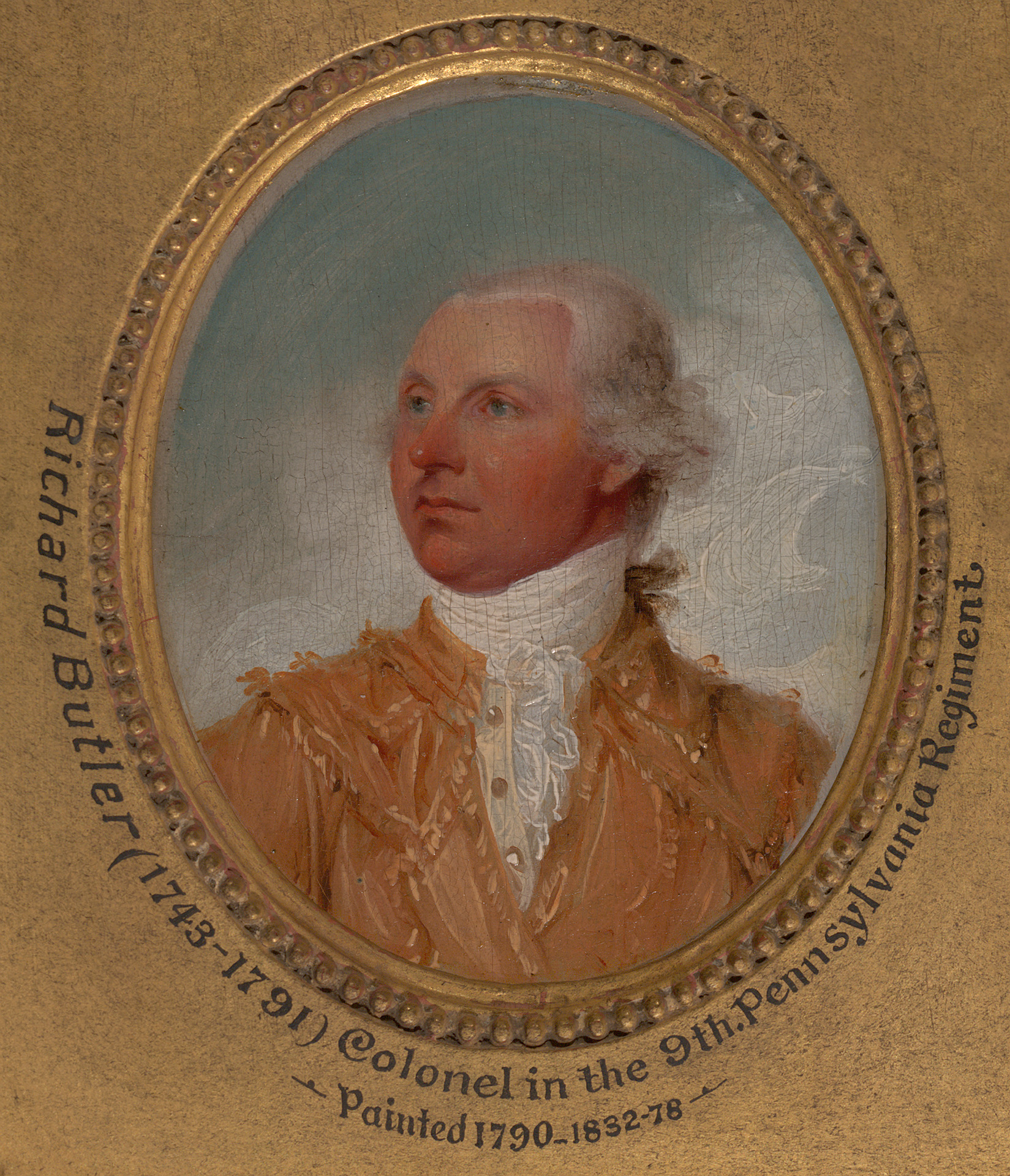
Richard Butler, 1790

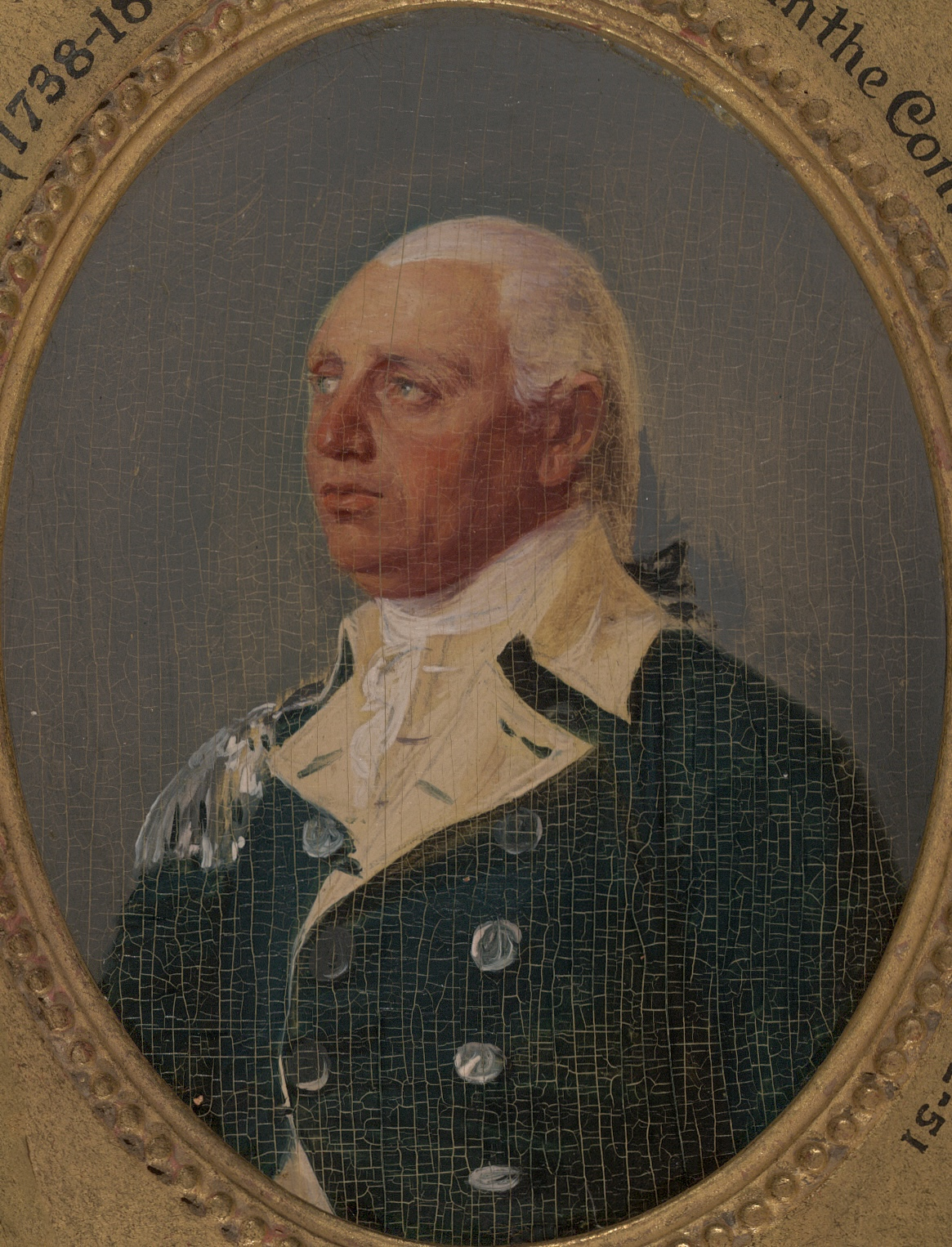
Rufus Putnam, 1790

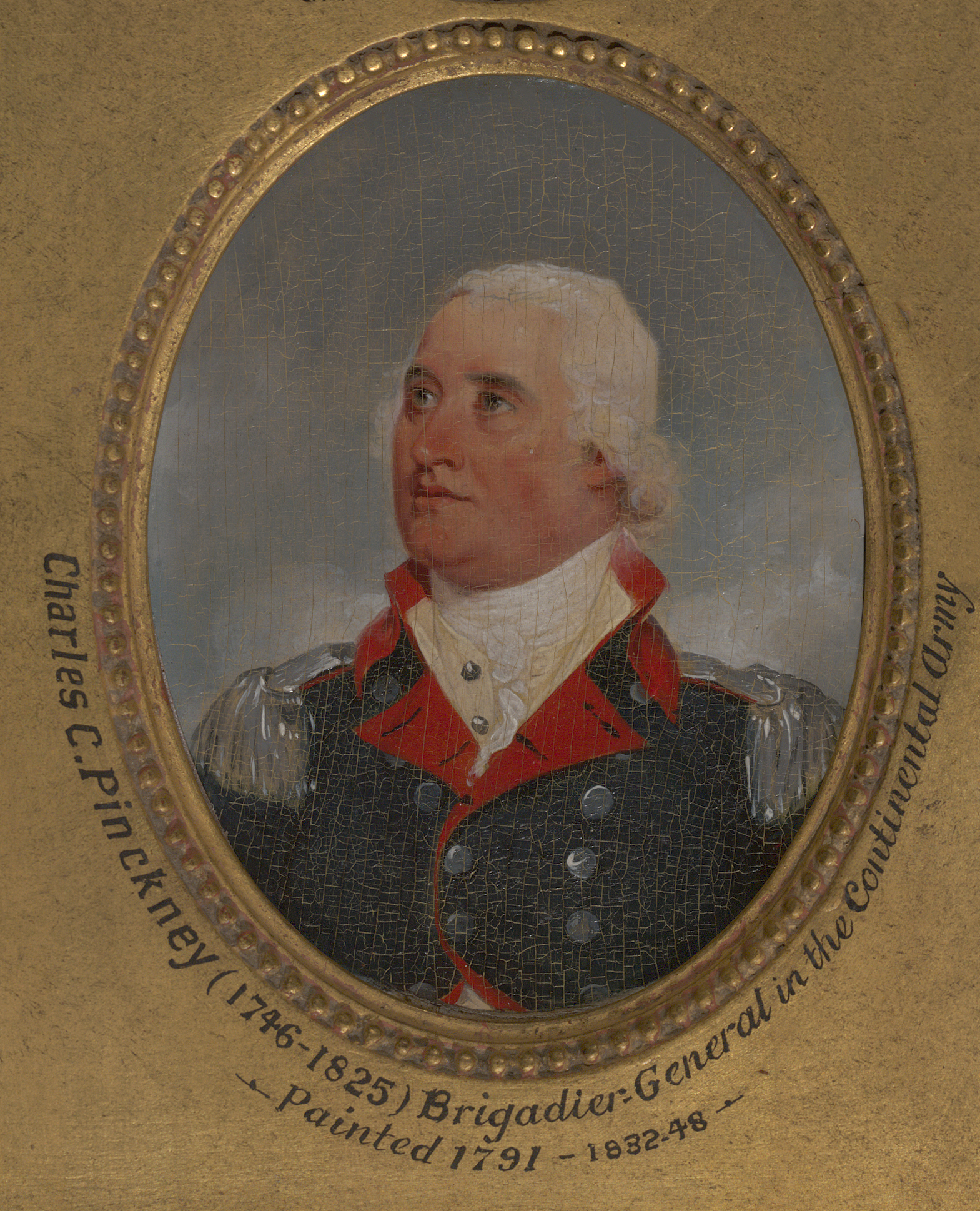
Charles Cotesworth Pinckney, 1791

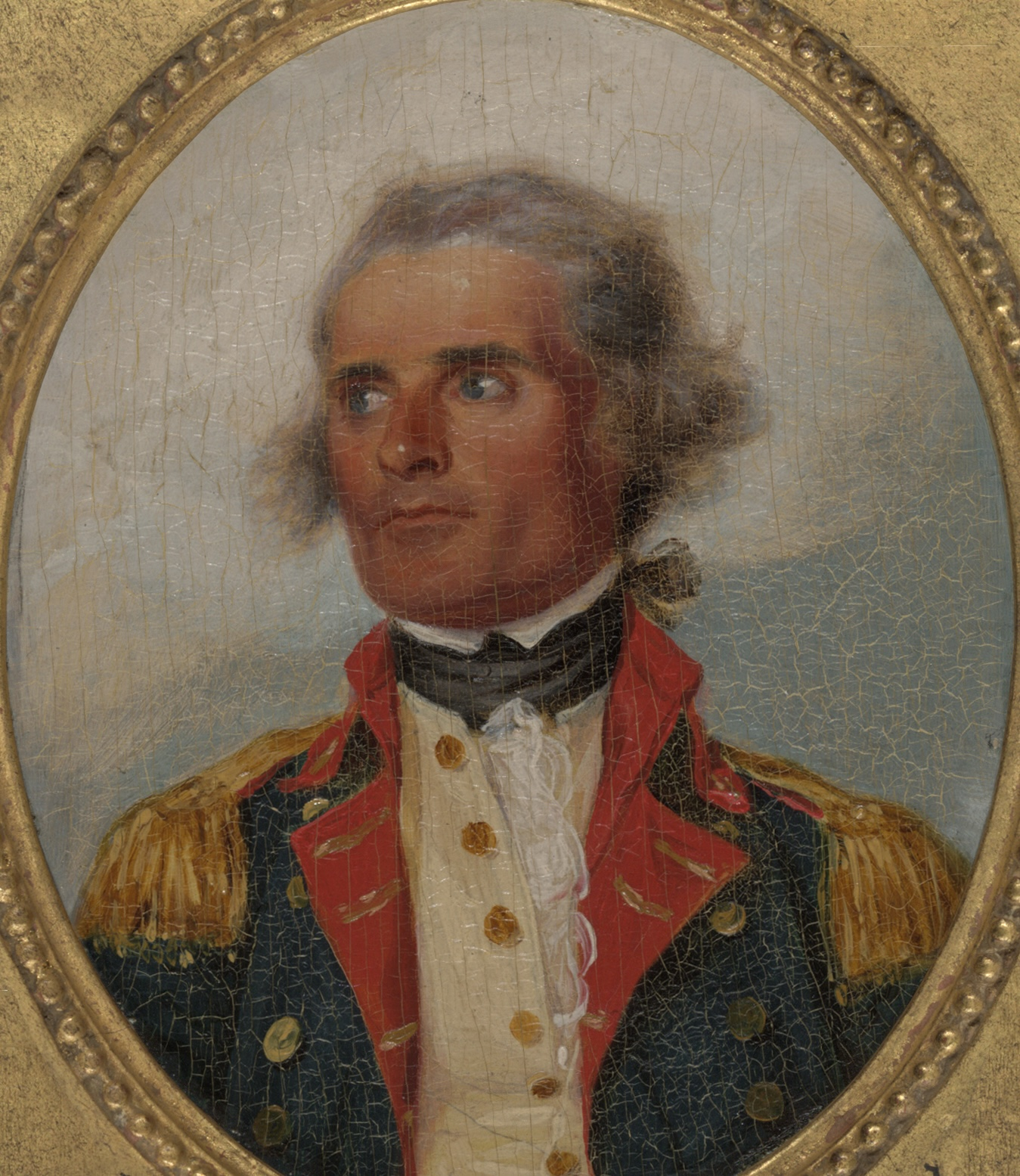
Ebenezer Stevens, 1791

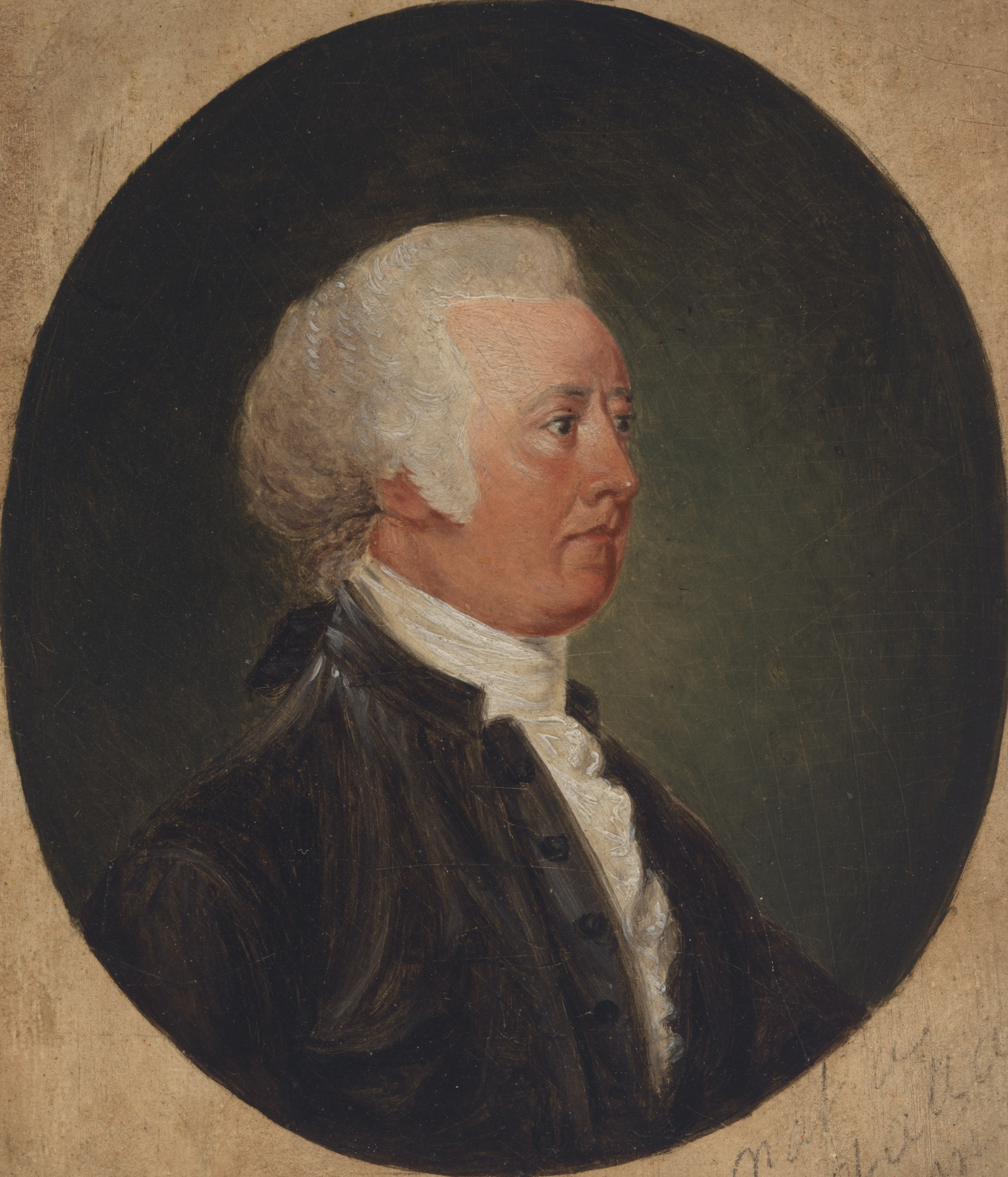
John Rutledge, 1791

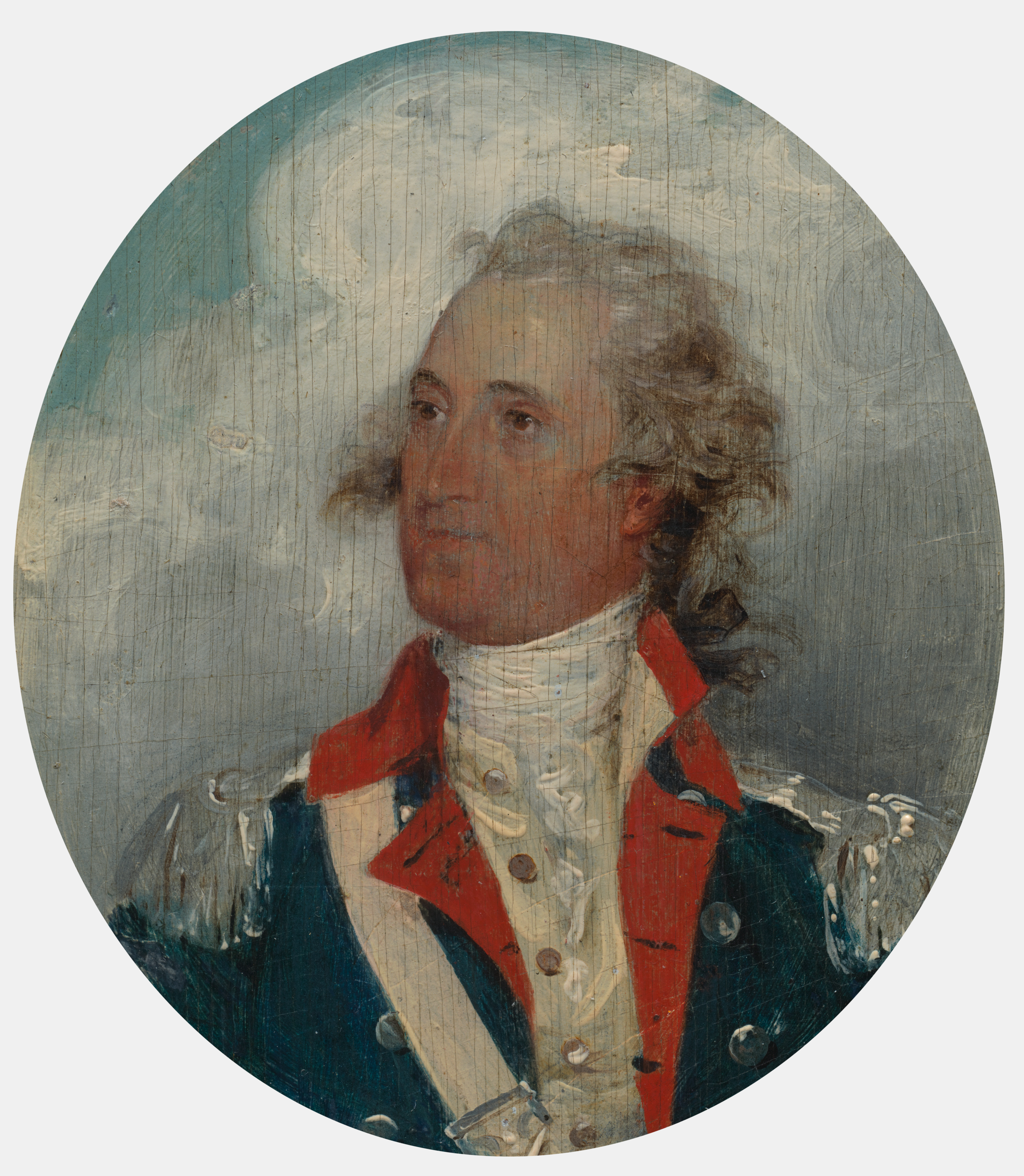
Thomas Pinckney, 1791

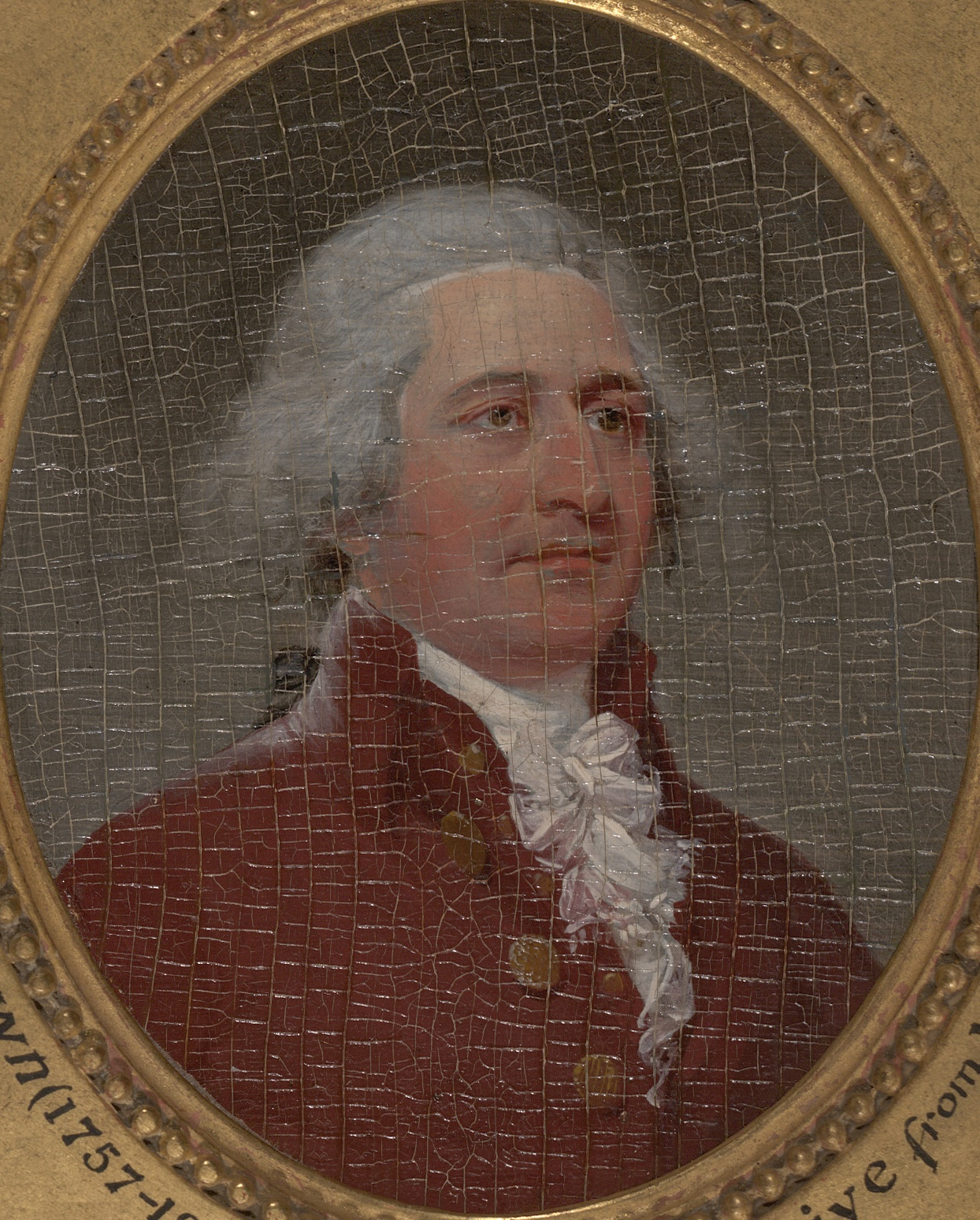
John Brown, 1792

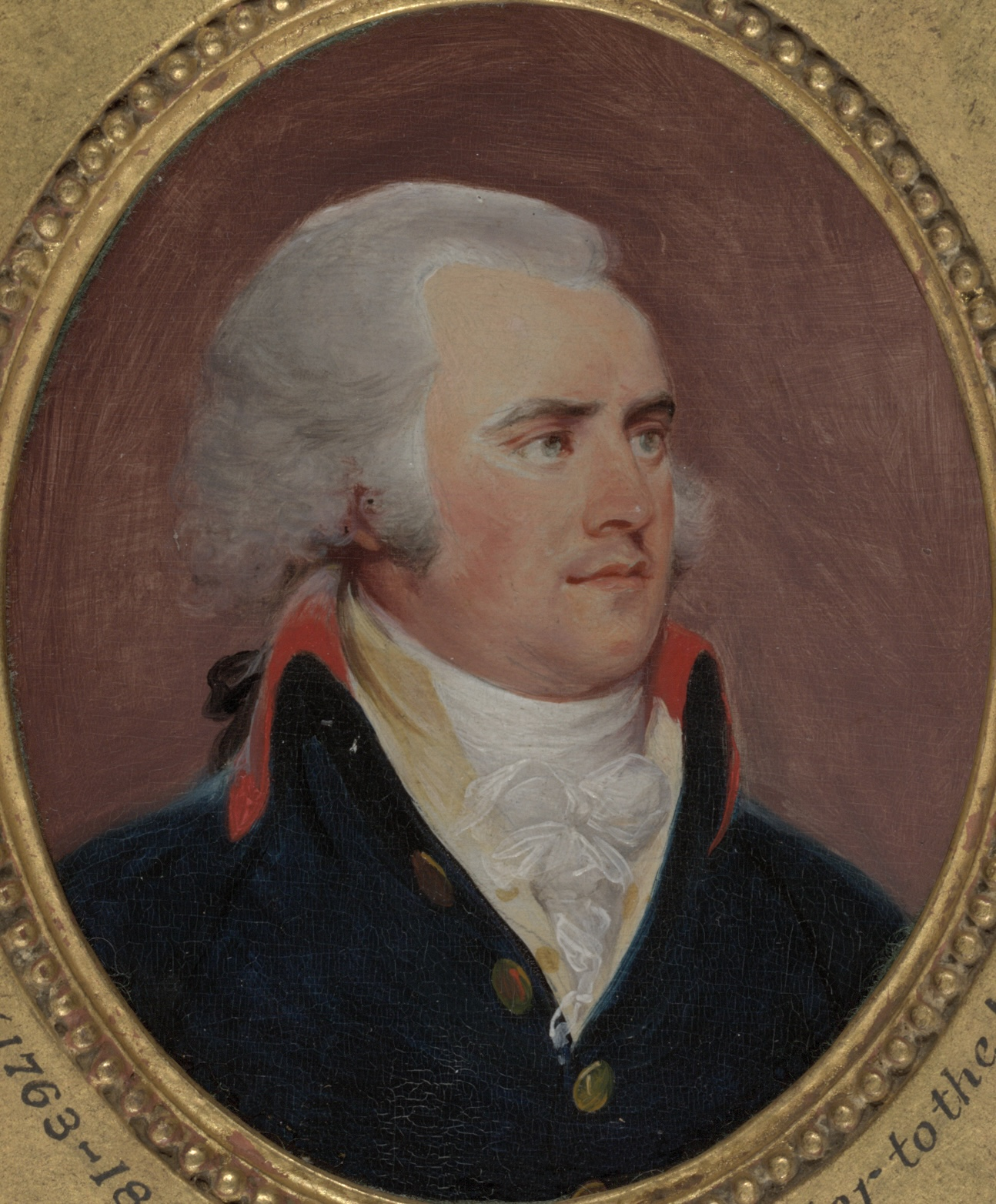
George Hammond, 1793

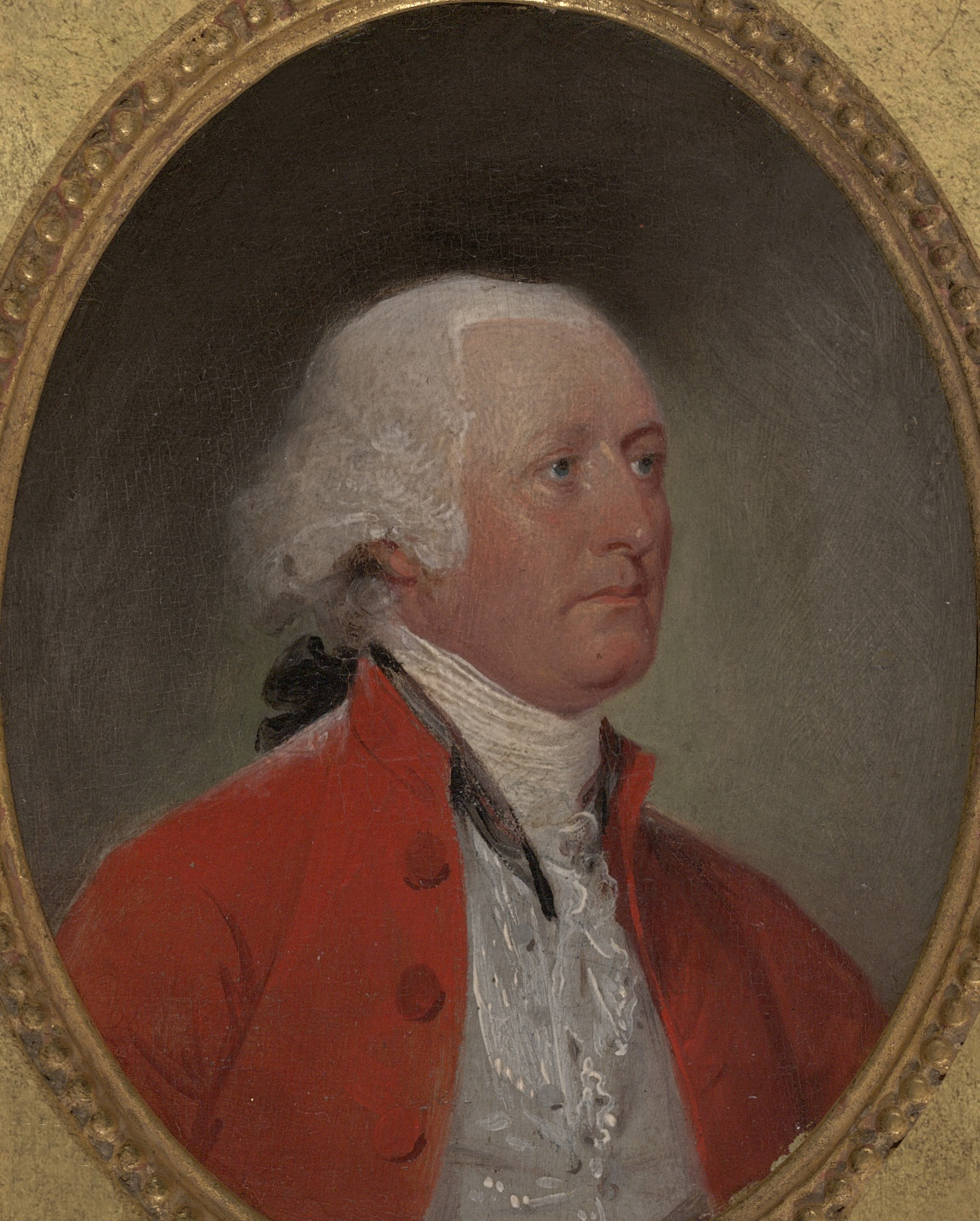
Jacob Read, 1793
