= Self-Portrait (Trumbull) =

Painting by John Trumbull

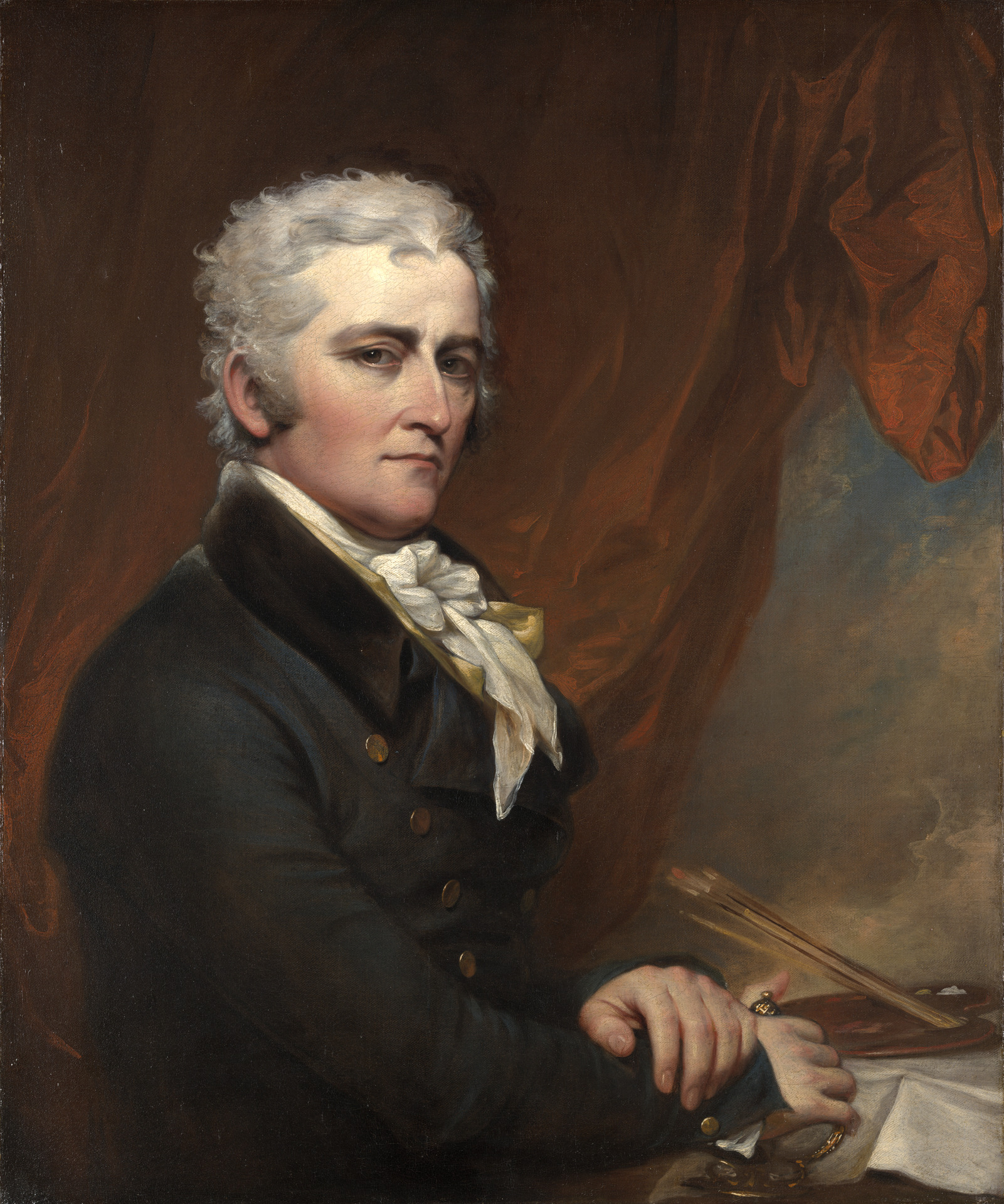
- Artist: John Trumbull
- Year: c. 1802
- Type: Oil on canvas, portrait painting
- Dimensions: 75.5 cm × 62.3 cm (29.7 in × 24.5 in)
- Location: Yale University Art Gallery, Connecticut

Self-Portrait is a c.1802 portrait painting by the American artist John Trumbull. A self-portrait, it depicts Trumbull at the beginning of the nineteenth century. It was painted while he was in London, his second lengthy spell in the British capital, as secretary to the commission applying the Jay Treaty.

Trumbull is best known for the series of history paintings he produced depicting scenes from the American Revolution and American War of Independence, several of which are now in the Capitol Rotunda in Washington. The painting is now in the collection of the Yale University Art Gallery in Connecticut.

== Bibliography ==
- Brookhiser, Richard. Glorious Lessons: John Trumbull, Painter of the American Revolution. Yale University Press, 2024.
- Christman, Margaret C.S. The Spirit of Party: Hamilton & Jefferson at Odds. Smithsonian Institution, 1992.
- Staiti, Paul. Of Arms and Artists: The American Revolution through Painters' Eyes. Bloomsbury Publishing USA, 2016
